= Dynamical time scale =

Time standard

Deviation of day length from SI based day

In time standards, dynamical time is the independent variable of the equations of celestial mechanics. This is in contrast to time scales such as mean solar time which are based on how far the earth has turned. Since Earth's rotation is not constant, using a time scale based on it for calculating the positions of heavenly objects gives errors. Dynamical time can be inferred from the observed position of an astronomical object via a theory of its motion. A first application of this concept of dynamical time was the definition of the ephemeris time scale (ET).

In the late 19th century it was suspected, and in the early 20th century it was established, that the rotation of the Earth (i.e. the length of the day) was both irregular on short time scales, and was slowing down on longer time scales. The suggestion was made, that observation of the position of the Moon, Sun and planets and comparison of the observations with their gravitational ephemerides would be a better way to determine a uniform time scale. A detailed proposal of this kind was published in 1948 and adopted by the IAU in 1952 (see Ephemeris time - history).

Using data from Newcomb's Tables of the Sun (based on the theory of the apparent motion of the Sun by Simon Newcomb, 1895, as retrospectively used in the definition of ephemeris time), the SI second was defined in 1960 as:

the fraction 1/31,556,925.9747 of the tropical year for 1900 January 0 at 12 hours ephemeris time.

Caesium atomic clocks became operational in 1955, and their use provided further confirmation that the rotation of the earth fluctuated randomly. This confirmed the unsuitability of the mean solar second of Universal Time as a precision measure of time interval. After three years of comparisons with lunar observations it was determined that the ephemeris second corresponded to 9,192,631,770 ± 20 cycles of the caesium resonance. In 1967/68 the length of the SI second was redefined to be 9,192,631,770 cycles of the caesium resonance, equal to the previous measurement result for the ephemeris second (see Ephemeris time - redefinition of the second).

In 1976, however, the IAU resolved that the theoretical basis for ephemeris time was wholly non-relativistic, and therefore, beginning in 1984 ephemeris time would be replaced by two further time scales with allowance for relativistic corrections. Their names, assigned in 1979, emphasized their dynamical nature or origin, Barycentric Dynamical Time (TDB) and Terrestrial Dynamical Time (TDT). Both were defined for continuity with ET and were based on what had become the standard SI second, which in turn had been derived from the measured second of ET.

During the period 1991–2006, the TDB and TDT time scales were both redefined and replaced, owing to difficulties or inconsistencies in their original definitions. The current fundamental relativistic time scales are Geocentric Coordinate Time (TCG) and Barycentric Coordinate Time (TCB); both of these have rates that are based on the SI second in respective reference frames (and hypothetically outside the relevant gravity well), but on account of relativistic effects, their rates would appear slightly faster when observed at the Earth's surface, and therefore diverge from local earth-based time scales based on the SI second at the Earth's surface. Therefore, the currently defined IAU time scales also include Terrestrial Time (TT) (replacing TDT, and now defined as a re-scaling of TCG, chosen to give TT a rate that matches the SI second when observed at the Earth's surface), and a redefined Barycentric Dynamical Time (TDB), a re-scaling of TCB to give TDB a rate that matches the SI second at the Earth's surface.

== See also ==
- Leap second
