= ΔT (timekeeping) =

Measure of variation of solar time from atomic time

TT-UT1 2000+

ΔT vs. time from 1657 to 2022

In precise timekeeping, ΔT is a measure of the cumulative effect of the departure of the Earth's rotation period from the fixed-length day of International Atomic Time (86,400 seconds). Formally, ΔT is the time difference ΔT = TT − UT between Universal Time (UT, defined by Earth's rotation) and Terrestrial Time (TT, independent of Earth's rotation). The value of ΔT for the start of 1902 was approximately zero; for 2002 it was about 64 seconds. Therefore, Earth's rotations over that century took about 64 seconds longer than would be required for days of atomic time. As well as this long-term drift in the length of the day there are short-term fluctuations in the length of day (Δτ) which are dealt with separately.

Since early 2017, the length of the day has happened to be very close to the conventional value, and ΔT has remained within half a second of 69 seconds.

== Calculation ==
Earth's rotational speed is ν = 1/2π dθ/dt, and a day corresponds to one period P = 1/ν. A rotational acceleration dν/dt gives a rate of change of the period of dP/dt = −1/ν^{2} dν/dt, which is usually expressed as α = ν dP/dt = −1/ν dν/dt. This has dimension of reciprocal time and is commonly reported in units of milliseconds-per-day per century, symbolized as ms/day/cy (understood as (ms/day)/cy). Integrating α gives an expression for ΔT against time.

=== Universal time ===
Universal Time is a time scale based on the Earth's rotation, which is somewhat irregular over short periods (days up to a century), thus any time based on it cannot have an accuracy better than approximately 1 in 10^{8}. However, a larger, more consistent effect has been observed over many centuries: Earth's rate of rotation is inexorably slowing down. This observed change in the rate of rotation is attributable to two primary forces, one decreasing and one increasing the Earth's rate of rotation. Over the long term, the dominating force is tidal friction, which is slowing the rate of rotation, contributing about α = +2.3 ms/day/cy or dP/dt = +2.3 ms/cy, which is equal to the very small fractional change +7.3×10^{−13} day/day. The most important force acting in the opposite direction, to speed up the rate, is believed to be a result of the melting of continental ice sheets at the end of the last glacial period. This removed their tremendous weight, allowing the land under them to begin to rebound upward in the polar regions, an effect that is still occurring today and will continue until isostatic equilibrium is reached. This "post-glacial rebound" brings mass closer to the rotational axis of the Earth, which makes the Earth spin faster, according to the law of conservation of angular momentum, similar to an ice skater pulling their arms in to spin faster. Models estimate this effect to contribute about −0.6 ms/day/cy. Combining these two effects, the net acceleration (actually a deceleration) of the rotation of the Earth, or the change in the length of the mean solar day (LOD), is +1.7 ms/day/cy or +62 s/cy^{2} or +46.5 ns/day^{2}. This matches the average rate derived from astronomical records over the past 27 centuries.

=== Terrestrial time ===
Terrestrial Time is a theoretical uniform time scale, defined to provide continuity with the former Ephemeris Time (ET). ET was an independent time-variable, proposed (and its adoption agreed) in the period 1948–1952 with the intent of forming a gravitationally uniform time scale as far as was feasible at that time, and depending for its definition on Simon Newcomb's Tables of the Sun (1895), interpreted in a new way to accommodate certain observed discrepancies. Newcomb's tables formed the basis of all astronomical ephemerides of the Sun from 1900 through 1983: they were originally expressed (and published) in terms of Greenwich Mean Time and the mean solar day, but later, in respect of the period 1960–1983, they were treated as expressed in terms of ET, in accordance with the adopted ET proposal of 1948–52. ET, in turn, can now be seen (in light of modern results) as close to the average mean solar time between 1750 and 1890 (centered on 1820), because that was the period during which the observations on which Newcomb's tables were based were performed. While TT is strictly uniform (being based on the SI second, every second is the same as every other second), it is in practice realised by International Atomic Time (TAI) with an accuracy of about 1 part in 10^{14}.

== Earth's rate of rotation ==
Earth's rate of rotation must be integrated to obtain time, which is Earth's angular position (specifically, the orientation of the meridian of Greenwich relative to the fictitious mean sun). Integrating +1.7 ms/d/cy and centering the resulting parabola on the year 1820 yields (to a first approximation) 32 × ((year − 1820)/100)^{2} − 20 seconds for ΔT. Smoothed historical measurements of ΔT using total solar eclipses are about +17190 s in the year −500 (501 BC), (Note: Physically, the meridian of Greenwich in Universal Time is almost always to the east of the meridian in Terrestrial Time, both in the past and in the future. This means that in the year −500 (501 BC), Earth's faster rotation would have caused any total solar eclipse to occur 71.625° to the east of the location identified using a calculation that assumed uniform TT. (Because +17190 s (about 4h 15m) corresponds to 71.625°E at 15m per degree)) +10580 s in 0 (1 BC), +5710 s in 500, +1570 s in 1000, and +200 s in 1500.

After the invention of the telescope, measurements were made by observing occultations of stars by the Moon, which allowed the derivation of more closely spaced and more accurate values for ΔT. ΔT continued to decrease until it reached a plateau of +11 ± 6 s between 1680 and 1866. For about three decades immediately before 1902 it was negative, reaching −6.64 s. Then it increased to +63.83 s in January 2000 and +68.97 s in January 2018 and +69.361 s in January 2020, after even a slight decrease from 69.358 s in July 2019 to 69.338 s in September and October 2019 and a new increase in November and December 2019.

While UTC tracked UT1 with one-second adjustments, this would have required the addition of an ever-greater number of leap seconds to UTC. (The SI second as now used for UTC, when adopted, was already a little shorter than the current value of the second of mean solar time. (Note: In the late 1950s, the caesium standard was used to measure both the current mean length of the second of mean solar time (UT2) (result: 9192631830 cycles) and also the second of ephemeris time (ET) (result: 9192631770 ± 20 cycles), see "Time Scales", by L Essen, in Metrologia, vol.4 (1968), pp.161–165, on p. 162. The ephemeris figure was chosen for the SI second. Essen in the same 1968 article (p.162) stated that this "seemed reasonable in view of the variations in UT2".))

== Values prior to 1955 ==
All values of ΔT before 1955 depend on observations of the Moon, either via eclipses or occultations. The angular momentum lost by the Earth due to friction induced by the Moon's tidal effect is transferred to the Moon, increasing its angular momentum, which means that its moment arm (approximately its distance from the Earth, i.e. precisely the semi-major axis of the Moon's orbit) is increased (for the time being about +3.8 cm/year), which via Kepler's laws of planetary motion causes the Moon to revolve around the Earth at a slower rate.

The cited values of ΔT assume that the lunar acceleration (actually a deceleration, that is a negative acceleration) due to this effect is dn/dt = −26″/cy^{2}, where n is the mean sidereal angular motion of the Moon. This is close to the best estimate for dn/dt as of 2002 of −25.858 ± 0.003″/cy^{2}, so ΔT need not be recalculated given the uncertainties and smoothing applied to its current values. Nowadays, UT is the observed orientation of the Earth relative to an inertial reference frame formed by extra-galactic radio sources, modified by an adopted ratio between sidereal time and solar time. Its measurement by several observatories is coordinated by the International Earth Rotation and Reference Systems Service (IERS).

== Current values ==
Recall ΔT = TT − UT1 by definition. While TT is only theoretical, it is commonly realized as TAI + 32.184 seconds. Trivially, TAI = (TAI − UTC) + UTC, and the offset TAI − UTC will remain fixed at its value when the last leap second was applied in 2016, which is 37 seconds, until another adjustment like a leap hour would be applied, which likely will not occur for several centuries.

Substituting, ΔT = ((37 s + UTC) + 32.184s) − UT1, which can be simplified further as ΔT = 69.184 s − DUT1, where DUT1 is UT1 − UTC. The value of DUT1 is sent out in the weekly IERS Bulletin A, as well as several time signal services, and by extension serve as a source of the current ΔT.

== Geological evidence ==
Tidal deceleration rates have varied over the history of the Earth-Moon system. Analysis of layering in fossil mollusc shells from 70 million years ago, in the Late Cretaceous period, shows that there were 372 days per year, and thus that the day was about 23.5 hours long then. Based on geological studies of tidal rhythmites, the day was 21.9 ± 0.4 hours long 620 million years ago and there were 13.1 ± 0.1 synodic months per year and 400 ± 7 solar days per year. The average recession rate of the Moon between then and now has been 2.17 ± 0.31 cm/year, which is about one-half the present rate. The present high rate may be due to near resonance between natural ocean frequencies and tidal frequencies.
