= Julian year (astronomy) =

Interval of exactly 365.25 Earth days

In astronomy, a Julian year (symbol: a or a_{j}) is a unit of measurement of time defined as exactly 365.25 days of 86400 SI seconds each. The length of the Julian year is the average length of the year in the Julian calendar that was used in Western societies until the adoption of the Gregorian Calendar, and from which the unit is named. Nevertheless, because astronomical Julian years are measuring duration rather than designating dates, this Julian year does not correspond to years in the Julian calendar or any other calendar, nor does it correspond to the many other ways of defining a year.

== Usage ==
The Julian year is not a unit of measurement in the International System of Units (SI), but it is recognized by the International Astronomical Union (IAU) as a non-SI unit for use in astronomy. Before 1984, both the Julian year and the mean tropical year were used by astronomers. In 1898, Simon Newcomb used both in his Tables of the Sun in the form of the Julian century (36 525 days) and the "solar century" (36524.22 days), a rounded form of 100 mean tropical years of 365.24219879 days each according to Newcomb. However, the mean tropical year is not suitable as a unit of measurement because it varies from year to year by a small amount, 6.14×10^{−8} days according to Newcomb. In contrast, the Julian year is defined in terms of the SI unit one second, so is as accurate as that unit and is constant. It approximates both the sidereal year and the tropical year to about ±0.008 days. The Julian year is the basis of the definition of the light-year as a unit of measurement of distance.

== Epochs ==
In astronomy, an epoch specifies a precise moment in time. The positions of celestial objects and events, as measured from Earth, change over time, so when measuring or predicting celestial positions, the epoch to which they pertain must be specified. A new standard epoch is chosen about every 50 years.

The standard epoch in use today is Julian epoch J2000.0. It is exactly 12:00 TT (close to but not exactly Greenwich mean noon) on January 1, 2000, in the Gregorian (not Julian) calendar. Julian within its name indicates that other Julian epochs can be a number of Julian years of 365.25 days each before or after J2000.0. For example, the future epoch J2100.0 will be exactly 36,525 days (one Julian century) from J2000.0 at 12:00 TT on January 1, 2100 (the dates will still agree because the Gregorian century 2000–2100 will have the same number of days as a Julian century).

Because Julian years are not exactly the same length as years on the Gregorian calendar, astronomical epochs will diverge noticeably from the Gregorian calendar in a few hundred years. For example, in the next 1000 years, seven days will be dropped from the Gregorian calendar but not from 1000 Julian years, so J3000.0 will be January 8, 3000 12:00 TT.

== Julian calendar distinguished ==
The Julian year, being a uniform measure of duration, should not be confused with the variable length historical years in the Julian calendar. An astronomical Julian year is never individually numbered. When not using Julian day numbers (see next section), astronomers follow the same conventional calendars that are accepted in the world community: They use the Gregorian calendar for events since its introduction on October 15, 1582 (or later, depending on country), and the Julian calendar for events before that date, and occasionally other, local calendars when appropriate for a given publication.

== Julian day distinguished ==
A Julian year should not be confused with the Julian day, which is also used in astronomy (more properly called the Julian day number or JDN). The JDN uniquely specifies a place in time, without becoming bogged down in its date-in-month, week, month, or year in any particular calendar. Despite the similarity of names, there is almost no connection between the Julian day numbers and Julian years.

The Julian day number is a simplified time-keeping system originally intended to ease calculation with historical dates which involve a diversity of local, idiosyncratic calendars. It was adopted by astronomers in the mid-1800s, and identifies each date as the integer number of days that have elapsed since a reference date ("epoch"), chosen to precede most, if not all, historical records. A specific time within a day, always using UTC, is specified via a decimal fraction.
