= Barycentric =

Barycentric can refer to:

In astronomy,

- Barycenter or barycentre, the center of mass of two or more bodies that orbit each other
- Barycentric coordinates, coordinates defined by the common center of mass of two or more bodies (see Barycenter)
- Barycentric Coordinate Time, a coordinate time standard in the Solar System
- Barycentric Dynamical Time, a former time standard in the Solar System

In geometry,

- Barycentric subdivision, a way of dividing a simplicial complex
- Barycentric coordinates (mathematics), coordinates defined by the vertices of a simplex

In numerical analysis,

- Barycentric interpolation formula, a way of interpolating a polynomial through a set of given data points using barycentric weights.
