= Terrestrial Time =

Time standard for astronomical observations from the Earth

Terrestrial Time (TT) is a modern astronomical time standard defined by the International Astronomical Union, primarily for time-measurements of astronomical observations made from the surface of Earth. (Note: The 1991 definition refers to the scale agreeing with the SI second "on the geoid", i.e. close to mean sea level on Earth's surface. A redefinition by resolution of the IAU 2000 24th General Assembly (Manchester), at Resolution B1.9, is in different terms intended for continuity and to come very close to the same standard.) For example, the Astronomical Almanac uses TT for its tables of positions (ephemerides) of the Sun, Moon and planets as seen from Earth. In this role, TT continues Terrestrial Dynamical Time (TDT or TD), (Note: TT is equivalent to TDT.) which succeeded ephemeris time (ET). TT shares the original purpose for which ET was designed, to be free of the irregularities in the rotation of Earth.

The unit of TT is the SI second, the definition of which is based currently on the caesium atomic clock, but TT is not itself defined by atomic clocks. It is a theoretical ideal, and real clocks can only approximate it.

TT is distinct from the time scale often used as a basis for civil purposes, Coordinated Universal Time (UTC). TT is indirectly the basis of UTC, via International Atomic Time (TAI). Because of the historical difference between TAI and ET when TT was introduced, TT is 32.184 s ahead of TAI.

== History ==
A definition of a terrestrial time standard was adopted by the International Astronomical Union (IAU) in 1976 at its XVI General Assembly and later named Terrestrial Dynamical Time (TDT). It was the counterpart to Barycentric Dynamical Time (TDB), which was a time standard for Solar system ephemerides, to be based on a dynamical time scale. Both of these time standards turned out to be imperfectly defined. Doubts were also expressed about the meaning of 'dynamical' in the name TDT.

In 1991, in Recommendation IV of the XXI General Assembly, the IAU redefined TDT, also renaming it "Terrestrial Time". TT was formally defined in terms of Geocentric Coordinate Time (TCG), defined by the IAU on the same occasion. TT was defined to be a linear scaling of TCG, such that the unit of TT is the "SI second on the geoid"; i.e. the rate approximately matched the rate of proper time on the Earth's surface at mean sea level. Thus the exact ratio between TT time and TCG time was $1-L_\mathrm{G}$, where $L_\mathrm{G} = U_\mathrm{G}/c^2$ was a constant and $U_\mathrm{G}$ was the gravitational potential at the geoid surface, a value measured by physical geodesy. In 1991 the best available estimate of $L_\mathrm{G}$ was 6.969291×10^{−10}.

In 2000, the IAU very slightly altered the definition of TT by adopting an exact value, L_{G}=6.969290134×10^{−10}.

== Current definition ==
TT differs from Geocentric Coordinate Time (TCG) by a constant rate. Formally it is defined by the equation

$$\mathrm{TT} = \bigl(1-L_\mathrm{G}\bigr) \times \mathrm{TCG} + E,$$

where TT and TCG are linear counts of SI seconds in Terrestrial Time and Geocentric Coordinate Time respectively, $L_\mathrm{G}$ is the constant difference in the rates of the two time scales, and $E$ is a constant to resolve the epochs (see below). $L_\mathrm{G}$ is defined as exactly 6.969290134×10^{−10}. Due to the term $1-L_\mathrm{G}$ the rate of TT is very slightly slower than that of TCG.

The equation linking TT and TCG more commonly has the form given by the IAU,

$$\mathrm{TT} = \mathrm{TCG} - L_\mathrm{G} \times \bigl(\mathrm{JD_{TCG}} - 2443144.5003725\bigr) \times 86400,$$

where $\mathrm{JD_{TCG}}$ is the TCG time expressed as a Julian date (JD). The Julian Date is a linear transformation of the raw count of seconds represented by the variable TCG, so this form of the equation is not simplified. The use of a Julian Date specifies the epoch fully. The above equation is often given with the Julian Date 2443144.5 for the epoch, but that is inexact (though inappreciably so, because of the small size of the multiplier $L_\mathrm{G}$). The value 2443144.5003725 is exactly in accord with the definition.

Time coordinates on the TT and TCG scales are specified conventionally using traditional means of specifying days, inherited from non-uniform time standards based on the rotation of Earth. Specifically, both Julian Dates and the Gregorian calendar are used. For continuity with their predecessor Ephemeris Time (ET), TT and TCG were set to match ET at around Julian Date 2443144.5 (1977-01-01T00Z). More precisely, it was defined that TT instant 1977-01-01T00:00:32.184 and TCG instant 1977-01-01T00:00:32.184 exactly correspond to the International Atomic Time (TAI) instant 1977-01-01T00:00:00.000. This is also the instant at which TAI introduced corrections for gravitational time dilation.

TT and TCG expressed as Julian Dates can be related precisely and most simply by the equation

$$\mathrm{JD_{TT}} = E_\mathrm{JD} + \bigl(\mathrm{JD_{TCG}} - E_\mathrm{JD}\bigr) \times \bigl(1 - L_\mathrm{G}\bigr),$$

where $E_\mathrm{JD}$ is 2443144.5003725 exactly.

== Realizations ==
TT is a theoretical ideal, not dependent on a particular realization. For practical use, physical clocks must be measured and their readings processed to estimate TT. A simple offset calculation is sufficient for most applications, but in demanding applications, detailed modeling of relativistic physics and measurement uncertainties may be needed.

=== TAI ===
The main realization of TT is supplied by TAI. The BIPM TAI service, performed since 1958, estimates TT using measurements from an ensemble of atomic clocks spread over the surface and low orbital space of Earth. TAI is canonically defined retrospectively, in monthly bulletins, in relation to the readings shown by that particular group of atomic clocks at the time. Estimates of TAI are also provided in real time by the institutions that operate the participating clocks. Because of the historical difference between TAI and ET when TT was introduced, the TAI realization of TT is defined thus:

$$\mathrm{TT(TAI) = TAI + 32.184 ~ s}.$$

The offset 32.184 s arises from history. The atomic time scale A1 (a predecessor of TAI) was set equal to UT2 at its conventional starting date of 1 January 1958, when ΔT (ET − UT) was about 32 seconds. The offset 32.184 seconds was the 1976 estimate of the difference between Ephemeris Time (ET) and TAI, "to provide continuity with the current values and practice in the use of Ephemeris Time".

TAI is never revised once published and TT(TAI) has small errors relative to TT(BIPM), on the order of 10-50 microseconds.

The GPS time scale has a nominal difference from atomic time (TAI − GPS time = +19 seconds), so that TT ≈ GPS time + 51.184 seconds. This realization introduces up to a microsecond of additional error, as the GPS signal is not precisely synchronized with TAI, but GPS receiving devices are widely available.

=== TT(BIPM) ===
Approximately annually since 1992, the International Bureau of Weights and Measures (BIPM) has produced better realizations of TT based on reanalysis of historical TAI data. BIPM's realizations of TT are named in the form "TT(BIPM08)", with the digits indicating the year of publication. They are published in the form of a table of differences from TT(TAI), along with an extrapolation equation that may be used for dates later than the table. The latest as of July 2024 is TT(BIPM23).

=== Pulsars ===
Researchers from the International Pulsar Timing Array collaboration have created a realization TT(IPTA16) of TT based on observations of an ensemble of pulsars up to 2012. This new pulsar time scale is an independent means of computing TT. The researchers observed that their scale was within 0.5 microsecond of TT(BIPM17), with significantly lower errors since 2003. The data used were insufficient to analyse long-term stability, and contained several anomalies, but as more data are collected and analysed, this realization may eventually be useful in identifying defects in TAI and TT(BIPM).

=== Other standards ===
TT is in effect a continuation of (but is more precisely uniform than) the former Ephemeris Time (ET). It was designed for continuity with ET, and it runs at the rate of the SI second, which was itself derived from a calibration using the second of ET (see, under Ephemeris time, Redefinition of the second and Implementations). The JPL ephemeris time argument T_{eph} is within a few milliseconds of TT.

TT is slightly ahead of UT1 (a refined measure of mean solar time at Greenwich) by an amount known as ΔT = TT − UT1. ΔT was measured at +67.6439 seconds (TT ahead of UT1) at 0 h UTC on 1 January 2015; and by retrospective calculation, ΔT was close to zero about the year 1900. ΔT is expected to continue to increase, with UT1 becoming steadily (but irregularly) further behind TT in the future. In fine detail, ΔT is somewhat unpredictable, with 10-year extrapolations diverging by 2-3 seconds from the actual value.

== Relativistic relationships ==
Observers in different locations, that are in relative motion or at different altitudes, can disagree about the rates of each other's clocks, owing to effects described by the theory of relativity. As a result, TT (even as a theoretical ideal) does not match the proper time of all observers.

In relativistic terms, TT is described as the proper time of a clock located on the geoid (essentially mean sea level). However, TT is now actually defined as a coordinate time scale. The redefinition did not quantitatively change TT, but rather made the existing definition more precise. In effect it defined the geoid (mean sea level) in terms of a particular level of gravitational time dilation relative to a notional observer located at infinitely high altitude.

The present definition of TT is a linear scaling of Geocentric Coordinate Time (TCG), which is the proper time of a notional observer who is infinitely far (so not affected by gravitational time dilation) and at rest relative to Earth. TCG is used to date mainly for theoretical purposes in astronomy. From the point of view of an observer on Earth's surface the TCG second passes slightly shorter than the observer's SI second whereas the TT second’s passing depends on the observer’s altitude with respect to sea level by the local gravitational acceleration.

== See also ==
- Barycentric Coordinate Time
- Geocentric Coordinate Time
