= SDSS J135646.10+102609.0 =

Low-redshift quasar and galaxy merger in the constellation Boötes

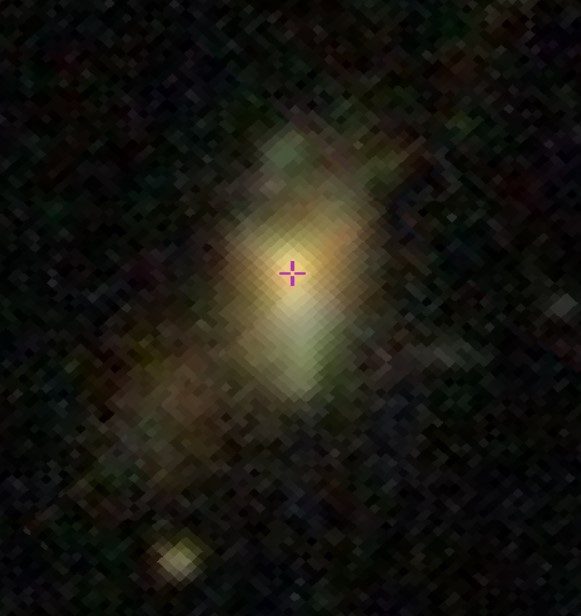
- The galaxy merger, SDSS J135646.10+102609.0

Observation data (J2000.0 epoch)
- Constellation: Boötes
- Right ascension: 13^{h} 56^{m} 46.10^{s}
- Declination: +10° 26′ 08.72″
- Redshift: 0.123134
- Heliocentric radial velocity: 36,915 km/s
- Distance: 1.853 Gly (568.1 Mpc)
- Apparent magnitude (V): 0.10
- Apparent magnitude (B): 0.13

Characteristics
- Type: QSO2
- Notable features: galaxy merger, luminous infrared galaxy

Other designations
- LEDA 1379498, 2MASX J13564607+1026088, IRAS F13543+1040, NVSS J135646+102609, 2CXO J135646.0+102608

SDSS J135646.10+102609.0 known as SDSS J1356+1026 and J1356+1026, is a low redshift quasar and galaxy merger located in the constellation of Boötes. It is located 1.85 billion light years from Earth. It is an ultraluminous inflared galaxy. It is considered radio-quiet with an unresolved radio source.

== Characteristics ==
SDSS J135646.10+102609.0 is a merger product between two colliding galaxies, namely a disk galaxy and an elliptical galaxy. The galaxy has a luminosity of L_{bol} ≈ 10^{46} erg s^{−1} with an estimated black hole mass of M ~ 10^{8} M_{Θ}.

SDSS J135646.10+102609.0 has two active nuclei found merging, with a projected separation of only 2.4 or ~ 2.5 kiloparsecs. While nothing is known about the south nucleus, the north nucleus is classified a type 2 quasar and is the main galaxy merger member. Its host is a massive early-type galaxy or an ETG for short, with a position angle of 156 degrees. With a stellar population mainly made up of old stars, the star formation rate of the galaxy derived from infrared luminosity is 69 M_{Θ} yr^{−1} according to a Atacama Large Millimeter Array (ALMA) sample. This high star formation rate indicates a consequence of an ongoing merger.

The north nucleus is heavily obscured. It was originally found during the Sloan Digital Sky Survey based on its [ O III] λ5007 emission. The north nucleus also has an average velocity dispersion value of 160 km s^{−1}. According to B-I color map of the galaxy using HST/WFC 3 images, astronomers found a dust lane crossing its nucleus with its position angle matching with the oxocarbon major axis. Using spatial scales, they were able to find the north nucleus has redder optical colors.

In addition, the north nucleus contains a compact rotating disk and an extended tidal arm. Both components contain molecular gas mass of M_{mol} ≈ 3 × 10^{8} M_{Θ} and M_{mol} ≈ 5 × 10^{8} M_{Θ}. Further investigations from ALMA also pointed out the tidal arm is the largest molecular tidal feature, implying a small chance of shock dissociation.

Further investigations also shows the presence of soft X-ray emission around the quasar nucleus of SDSS J135646.10+102609.0, extending by 20 kiloparsecs (kpc). This is interpreted as thermal gas with a luminosity of LX ≈ 10^{42} erg s^{−1} and temperature of KT ≈ 280 eV. With a faint X-ray luminosity of ~ 10, this suggests the X-ray emission is controlled by either photoionization or shocked emission via a quasar-driven superwind. A study also mentions the superwind driven by the quasar is prototypical.

== Galactic outflow ==
SDSS J135646.10+102609.0 has two symmetric outflows originating from its nucleus. The outflows are measured to be 10 kpc and have observed projected expansion velocities of 250 km s^{−1}. Through a presentation of a kinetic model, the deprojected expansion velocity for this outflows are measured ~ 1000 km^{−1} with expanding shell kinetic energy of 10^{44-45} erg s^{−1}.

== Star formation ==
Based on observations from ALMA and oxocarbon observations, a low star formation rate of 16 M_{Θ} yr^{−1} from far-infrared spectral energy and <16 M_{Θ} yr^{−1} from the molecular content is found in SDSS J135646.10+102609.0. This suggests the active galactic nucleus of the galaxy is likely responsible for high outflow rate. With an outflowing mass of M_{mol} ≈ 7 × 10^{7} M_{Θ}, and short dynamical time, the outflow could potentially depleting the gas content inside SDSS J135646.10+102609.0 within few million years.

== Double-peaked emission lines ==
SDSS J135646.10+102609.0 is known to be an interesting system. According to long-slit observations, it contains two [O III] λ5007 emission knots proportional to the two nuclei seen in near-infrared imaging suggesting the double peaks are produced by a dual AGN. However when the extended [O III] emission and nuclei were observed again, this creates a speculation the double peaks are only powered by a single AGN.
