= International Atomic Time =

Time standard based on atomic clocks

International Atomic Time (TAI, from its French name temps atomique international) is a high-precision atomic coordinate time standard based on the notional passage of proper time on Earth's geoid. TAI is a weighted average of the time kept by over 450 atomic clocks in over 80 national laboratories worldwide. It is a continuous scale of time, without leap seconds, and it is the principal realisation of Terrestrial Time (with a fixed offset of epoch). It is the basis for Coordinated Universal Time (UTC), which is used for civil timekeeping all over the Earth's surface and which had leap seconds.

UTC deviates from TAI by a number of whole seconds. UTC has been exactly 37 seconds behind TAI since 00:00:00 UTC on 1 January 2017, immediately after the final leap second was put into effect. The 37 seconds result from the initial difference of 10 seconds at the start of 1972, plus the 27 leap seconds in UTC after 1972. In 2026, the General Conference on Weights and Measures decided to abandon the leap second effective 20 May 2027.

TAI may be reported using traditional means of specifying days, carried over from non-uniform time standards based on the rotation of the Earth. Specifically, both Julian days and the Gregorian calendar are used. TAI in this form was synchronised with Universal Time at the beginning of 1958, and the two have drifted apart ever since, due primarily to the slowing rotation of the Earth.

== Operation ==
TAI is a weighted average of the time kept by over 450 atomic clocks in over 80 national laboratories worldwide. The majority of the clocks involved are caesium clocks; the International System of Units (SI) definition of the second is based on caesium. The clocks are compared using GPS signals and two-way satellite time and frequency transfer. Due to the signal averaging TAI is an order of magnitude more stable than its best constituent clock.

The participating institutions each broadcast, in real time, a frequency signal with timecodes, which is their estimate of TAI. Time codes are usually published in the form of UTC, which differs from TAI by a well-known integer number of seconds. These time scales are denoted in the form UTC(NPL) in the UTC form, where NPL here identifies the National Physical Laboratory, UK. The TAI form may be denoted TAI(NPL). The latter is not to be confused with TA(NPL), which denotes an independent atomic time scale, not synchronised to TAI or to anything else.

The clocks at different institutions are regularly compared against each other. The International Bureau of Weights and Measures (BIPM, France) combines these measurements to retrospectively calculate the weighted average that forms the most stable time scale possible. This combined time scale is published monthly in "Circular T" and is the canonical TAI. This time scale is expressed in the form of tables of differences UTC − UTC(k) (equal to TAI − TAI(k)) for each participating institution k. The same circular also gives tables of TAI − TA(k), for the various unsynchronised atomic time scales.

Errors in publication may be corrected by issuing a revision of the faulty Circular T or by errata in a subsequent Circular T. Aside from this, once published in Circular T, the TAI scale is not revised. In hindsight, it is possible to discover errors in TAI and to make better estimates of the true proper time scale. Since the published circulars are definitive, better estimates do not create another version of TAI; it is instead considered to be creating a better realisation of Terrestrial Time (TT).

== History ==
Early atomic time scales consisted of quartz clocks with frequencies calibrated by a single atomic clock; the atomic clocks were not operated continuously. Atomic timekeeping services started experimentally in 1955, using the first caesium atomic clock at the National Physical Laboratory, UK (NPL). It was used as a basis for calibrating the quartz clocks at the Royal Greenwich Observatory and to establish a time scale, called Greenwich Atomic (GA). The United States Naval Observatory began the A.1 scale on 13 September 1956, using an Atomichron commercial atomic clock, followed by the NBS-A scale at the National Bureau of Standards, Boulder, Colorado on 9 October 1957.

The International Time Bureau (BIH) began a time scale, T_{m} or AM, in July 1955, using both local caesium clocks and comparisons to distant clocks using the phase of VLF radio signals. The BIH scale, A.1, and NBS-A were defined by an epoch at the beginning of 1958. (Note: They were set to read Julian Date 2436204.5 (1 January 1958 00:00:00) at the corresponding UT2 instant. However, each observatory used its own value of UT2.) The procedures used by the BIH evolved, and the name for the time scale changed: A3 in 1964 and TA(BIH) in 1969.

The SI second was defined in terms of the caesium atom in 1967. From 1971 to 1975, the General Conference on Weights and Measures and the International Committee for Weights and Measures made a series of decisions that designated the BIPM time scale International Atomic Time (TAI).

In the 1970s, it became clear that the clocks participating in TAI were ticking at different rates due to gravitational time dilation, and the combined TAI scale, therefore, corresponded to an average of the altitudes of the various clocks. Starting from the Julian Date 2443144.5 (1 January 1977 00:00:00 TAI), corrections were applied to the output of all participating clocks, so that TAI would correspond to proper time at the geoid (mean sea level). Because the clocks were, on average, well above sea level, this meant that TAI slowed by about one part in a trillion. The former uncorrected time scale continues to be published under the name EAL (Échelle Atomique Libre, meaning Free Atomic Scale).

The instant that the gravitational correction started to be applied serves as the epoch for Barycentric Coordinate Time (TCB), Geocentric Coordinate Time (TCG), and Terrestrial Time (TT), which represent three fundamental time scales in the Solar System. All three of these time scales were defined to read JD 2443144.5003725 (1 January 1977 00:00:32.184) exactly at that instant. (Note: The 32.184 second offset is to provide continuity with the older ephemeris time.) TAI was henceforth a realisation of TT, with the equation TT(TAI) = TAI + 32.184 s.

The continued existence of TAI was questioned in a 2007 letter from the BIPM to the ITU-R, which stated, "In the case of a redefinition of UTC without leap seconds, the CCTF would consider discussing the possibility of suppressing TAI, as it would remain parallel to the continuous UTC."

== Relation to UTC ==
Contrary to TAI, UTC was a discontinuous time scale. It was occasionally adjusted by leap seconds. Between these adjustments, it is composed of segments that are mapped to atomic time by a constant offset. From its beginning in 1961 through December 1971, the adjustments were made regularly in fractional leap seconds so that UTC approximated UT2. From 1972 to 2016 (inclusive), these adjustments were made only in whole seconds to approximate UT1. This was a compromise arrangement in order to enable a publicly broadcast time scale. The less frequent whole-second adjustments meant that the time scale would be more stable and easier to synchronise internationally. The fact that it continued to approximate UT1 means that tasks, such as navigation, which require a source of Universal Time, continued to be well served by the public broadcast of UTC.

== See also ==
- Clock synchronization
- History of timekeeping devices
- Time and frequency transfer

== Bibliography ==
- "Glossary and Definitions of Time and Frequency Terms" (PDF). ITU-R. December 2013.
- Guinot, B (2000). "History of the Bureau International de l'Heure". Polar Motion: Historical and Scientific Problems. ASP Conference Series, Vol. 208. Vol. 208. p. 175. Bibcode:2000ASPC..208..175G. ISBN 1-58381-039-0. Archived from the original on 1 August 2022.
- McCarthy, Dennis D.; Seidelmann, Kenneth P. (2009). Time: From Earth Rotation to Atomic Physics. Weinheim: Wiley-VCH Verlag GmbH & Co. KGaA. ISBN 978-3-527-40780-4. Archived from the original on 3 February 2021.
