= Geocentric Coordinate Time =

Time standard used in astronomy

Geocentric Coordinate Time (TCG, temps-coordonnée géocentrique) is a coordinate time standard intended to be used as the independent variable of time for all calculations pertaining to precession, nutation, the Moon, and artificial satellites of the Earth. It is equivalent to the proper time experienced by a clock at rest in a coordinate frame co-moving with the center of the Earth: that is, a clock that performs exactly the same movements as the Earth but is outside the Earth's gravity well. It is therefore not influenced by the gravitational time dilation caused by the Earth. The TCG is the time coordinate for the Geocentric Celestial Reference System (GCRS).

TCG was defined in 1991 by the International Astronomical Union. Unlike former astronomical time scales, TCG is defined in the context of the general theory of relativity. The relationships between TCG and other relativistic time scales are defined with fully general relativistic metrics.

Because the reference frame for TCG is not rotating with the surface of the Earth and not in the gravitational potential of the Earth, TCG ticks faster than clocks on the surface of the Earth by a factor of about 7.0×10^{−10} (about 22 milliseconds per year). Consequently, the values of physical constants to be used with calculations using TCG differ from the traditional values of physical constants. (The traditional values were in a sense wrong, incorporating corrections for the difference in time scales.) Adapting the large body of existing software to change from TDB (Barycentric Dynamical Time) to TCG is a formidable task, and as of 2002 many calculations continue to use TDB in some form.

Time coordinates on the TCG scale are conventionally specified using traditional means of specifying days, carried over from non-uniform time standards based on the rotation of the Earth. Specifically, both Julian Dates and the Gregorian calendar are used. For continuity with its predecessor Ephemeris Time, TCG was set to match ET at around Julian Date 2443144.5 (1977-01-01T00Z). More precisely, it was defined that TCG instant 1977-01-01T00:00:32.184 exactly corresponds to TAI instant 1977-01-01T00:00:00.000 exactly. This is also the instant at which TAI introduced corrections for gravitational time dilation.

TCG is a Platonic or ideal time scale, not dependent on a particular realization. For practical purposes, TCG must be embodied by actual clocks in the Earth system. Because of the linear relationship between Terrestrial Time (TT) and TCG, the same clocks that measure TT are compatible with TCG. See the article on TT for details of the relationship and how TT is measured.

Barycentric Coordinate Time (TCB) is the analog of TCG, used for calculations relating to the Solar System beyond Earth orbit. TCG is defined by a different reference frame from TCB, such that they are not linearly related. Over the long term, TCG ticks more slowly than TCB by about 1.6×10^{−8} (about 0.5 seconds per year). In addition there are periodic variations, as Earth moves within the Solar System. When the Earth is at perihelion in January, TCG ticks even more slowly than it does on average, due to gravitational time dilation from being deeper in the Sun's gravity well and also velocity time dilation from moving swiftlier relative to the Sun. At aphelion in July the opposite holds, with TCG ticking swiftlier than it does on average.
