= Barycentric Dynamical Time =

Linear scaling of Barycentric Coordinate Time

Barycentric Dynamical Time (TDB, from the French Temps Dynamique Barycentrique) is a relativistic coordinate time scale, intended for astronomical use as a time standard to take account of time dilation when calculating orbits and astronomical ephemerides of planets, asteroids, comets and interplanetary spacecraft in the Solar System. TDB is now (since 2006) defined as a linear scaling of Barycentric Coordinate Time (TCB). A feature that distinguishes TDB from TCB is that TDB, when observed from the Earth's surface, has a difference from Terrestrial Time (TT) that is about as small as can be practically arranged with consistent definition: the differences are mainly periodic, and overall will remain at less than 2 milliseconds for several millennia.

TDB applies to the Solar-System-barycentric reference frame, and was first defined in 1976 as a successor to the (non-relativistic) former standard of ephemeris time (adopted by the IAU in 1952 and superseded 1976). In 2006, after a history of multiple time-scale definitions and deprecations since the 1970s, a redefinition of TDB was approved by the IAU. The 2006 IAU redefinition of TDB as an international standard expressly acknowledged that the long-established JPL ephemeris time argument T_{eph}, as implemented in JPL Development Ephemeris DE405, "is for practical purposes the same as TDB defined in this Resolution". (By 2006, ephemeris DE405 had already been in use for a few years as the official basis for planetary and lunar ephemerides in the Astronomical Almanac; it was the basis for editions for 2003 through 2014; in the edition for 2015 it was superseded by DE430.)

== Definition ==
IAU resolution 3 of 2006 defines TDB as a linear transformation of TCB. TCB diverges from both TDB and TT. TCB progresses faster at a differential rate of about 0.5 second/year, while TDB and TT remain close. As of the beginning of 2011, the difference between TDB and TCB is about 16.6 seconds.

TDB = TCB − L_{B}×(JD_{TCB} − T_{0})×86400 + TDB_{0}

where L_{B} = 1.550519768×10^{−8}, TDB_{0} = −6.55×10^{−5} s, T_{0} = 2443144.5003725, and JD_{TCB} is the TCB Julian date (that is, a quantity which was equal to T_{0} on 1977 January 1 00:00:00 TAI at the geocenter and which increases by one every 86400 seconds of TCB).

== History ==
From the 17th century to the late 19th century, planetary ephemerides were calculated using time scales based on the Earth's rotation: usually the mean solar time of one of the principal observatories, such as Paris or Greenwich. After 1884, mean solar time at Greenwich became a standard, later named Universal Time (UT). But in the later 19th and early 20th centuries, with the increasing precision of astronomical measurements, it began to be suspected, and was eventually established, that the rotation of the Earth (i.e. the length of the day) showed irregularities on short time scales, and was slowing down on longer time scales. Ephemeris time was consequently developed as a standard that was free from the irregularities of Earth rotation, by defining the time "as the independent variable of the equations of celestial mechanics", and it was at first measured astronomically, relying on the existing gravitational theories of the motions of the Earth about the Sun and of the Moon about the Earth.

After the caesium atomic clock was invented, such clocks were used increasingly from the late 1950s as secondary realizations of ephemeris time (ET). These secondary realizations improved on the original ET standard by the improved uniformity of the atomic clocks, and (e.g. in the late 1960s) they were used to provide standard time for planetary ephemeris calculations and in astrodynamics.

But ET in principle did not yet take account of relativity theory. The size of the periodic part of the variations due to time dilation between earth-based atomic clocks and the coordinate time of the Solar-System barycentric reference frame had been estimated at under 2 milliseconds, but in spite of this small size, it was increasingly considered in the early 1970s that time standards should be made suitable for applications in which differences due to relativistic time dilation could no longer be neglected.

In 1976, two new time scales were defined to replace ET (in the ephemerides for 1984 and afterwards) to take account of relativity. ET's direct successor for measuring time on a geocentric basis was Terrestrial Dynamical Time (TDT). The new time scale to supersede ET for planetary ephemerides was to be Barycentric Dynamical Time (TDB). TDB was to tick uniformly in a reference frame comoving with the barycenter of the Solar System. (As with any coordinate time, a corresponding clock, to coincide in rate, would need not only to be at rest in that reference frame, but also (an unattainable hypothetical condition) to be located outside all of the relevant gravity wells.) In addition, TDB was to have (as observed/evaluated at the Earth's surface), over the long term average, the same rate as TDT (now TT). TDT and TDB were defined in a series of resolutions at the same 1976 meeting of the International Astronomical Union.

It was eventually realized that TDB was not well defined because it was not accompanied by a general relativistic metric and because the exact relationship between TDB and TDT had not been specified. (It was also later criticized as being not physically possible in exact accordance with its original definition: among other things the 1976 definition excluded a necessary small offset for the initial epoch of 1977.) After the difficulties were appreciated, in 1991 the IAU refined the official definitions of timescales by creating additional new time scales: Barycentric Coordinate Time (TCB) and Geocentric Coordinate Time (TCG). TCB was intended as a replacement for TDB, and TCG was its equivalent for use in near-Earth space. TDT was also renamed to Terrestrial Time (TT), because of doubts raised about the appropriateness of the word "dynamical" in that connection.

In 2006 TDB was redefined by IAU 2006 resolution 3; the 'new' TDB was expressly acknowledged as equivalent for practical purposes to JPL ephemeris time argument T_{eph}; the difference between TDB according to the 2006 standard and TT (both as observed from the surface of the Earth), remains under 2 ms for several millennia around the present epoch.

== Use of TDB ==
TDB is a successor of Ephemeris Time (ET), in that ET can be seen (within the limits of the lesser accuracy and precision achievable in its time) to be an approximation to TDB as well as to Terrestrial Time (TT) (see Ephemeris time § Implementations). TDB in the form of the very closely analogous, and practically equivalent, time scale T_{eph} continues to be used for the important DE405 planetary and lunar ephemerides from the Jet Propulsion Laboratory.

Arguments have been put forward for the continued practical use of TDB rather than TCB based on the very small size of the difference between TDB and TT, not exceeding 0.002 second, which can be neglected for many applications. It has been argued that the smallness of this difference makes for a lower risk of damage if TDB is ever confused with TT, compared to the possible damage of confusing TCB and TT, which have a relative linear drift of about 0.5 second per year, (the difference was close to zero at the start of 1977, and by 2009 was already over a quarter of a minute and increasing).
