= Coordinate time =

Time coordinate in relativity theory

In the theory of relativity, it is convenient to express results in terms of a spacetime coordinate system relative to an implied observer. In many coordinate systems, an event is specified by one time coordinate and three spatial coordinates. The time specified by the time coordinate is referred to as coordinate time to distinguish it from proper time.

In the special case of an inertial observer in special relativity, by convention, the coordinate time at an event is equal to the proper time measured by a clock at the event's location, provided the clock is stationary relative to the observer and has been synchronized using the Einstein synchronisation convention.

== Coordinate time, proper time, and clock synchronization ==
A fuller explanation of the concept of coordinate time arises from its relationship with proper time and clock synchronization. Synchronization, along with the related concept of simultaneity, requires a precise definition within general relativity because many assumptions inherent in classical mechanics regarding space and time no longer apply. Specific clock synchronization procedures defined by Albert Einstein give rise to a frame-dependent concept of simultaneity.

Two events are defined as simultaneous in a chosen reference frame if and only if the chosen coordinate time has the same value for both events. Consequently, two events that are simultaneous in one reference frame will generally not be simultaneous when viewed from another.

Outside special relativity, coordinate time cannot generally be measured by a clock located at the nominal origin of the reference frame. For example, a clock located at the Solar System barycenter does not directly measure the coordinate time of the Barycentric Celestial Reference Frame, nor does a clock at the Geocenter measure the coordinate time of the Geocentric Reference Frame.

== Mathematics ==
In general relativity and for non-inertial observers, coordinate systems can be chosen freely. For a clock whose spatial coordinates remain constant, the relationship between proper time $\tau$ (Greek lowercase tau) and coordinate time $t$—representing the rate of time dilation—is given by:

$\frac{d\tau}{dt} = \sqrt{-g_{00}}$

1

where $g_{00}$ is the timelike component of the metric tensor, which incorporates gravitational time dilation (under the metric sign convention where the zeroth component is negative).

An alternative formulation, accurate to order $1/c^2$, expresses the relation between proper time and coordinate time using dynamical quantities:

$\frac{d\tau}{dt} = 1 - \frac{U}{c^2} - \frac{v^2}{2c^2}$

2

where:

$$U = \sum_i \frac{GM_i}{r_i}$$

is the total Newtonian gravitational potential due to neighboring masses at distances $r_i$ from the clock (evaluated using the positive astronomical sign convention for gravitational potentials).

The speed of light is denoted by $c$, and $v$ represents the coordinate velocity of the clock within the chosen reference frame:

$v^2 = \frac{dx^2 + dy^2 + dz^2}{dt^2}$

3

where $dx, dy, dz,$ and $dt$ are infinitesimal increments in spatial coordinates ($x, y, z$) and coordinate time ($t$).

Equation (2) is a foundational differential equation governing the rate of time dilation. A derivation from the Schwarzschild metric can be found in Time dilation § Combined effect of velocity and gravitational time dilation.

== Measurement ==
Coordinate time cannot be directly measured; it must be calculated from the proper-time readings of physical clocks using relation (2) or a refined variant thereof.

Hypothetically, one can imagine a trajectory where a clock's proper time matches coordinate time exactly: such a clock would have to be stationary relative to the reference frame ($v = 0$) and located infinitely far away from all gravitational masses ($U = 0$). However, this conceptual illustration is of limited practical use because coordinate time is defined throughout the spacetime manifold, whereas a physical clock follows a specific worldline.

== Coordinate time scales ==
A coordinate time scale (or coordinate time standard) is a time standard designed to serve as the time coordinate in relativistic astronomical computations. Selecting a coordinate time scale implies choosing a complete reference frame.

As noted above, coordinate time can be conceptualized as the proper time of a hypothetically ideal clock at rest relative to the frame and located infinitely far from all masses. Because it lies outside all gravity wells, this hypothetical clock is unaffected by gravitational time dilation. Clocks inside gravity wells experience gravitational and motional time dilation relative to coordinate time, according to equation (2).

The IAU has defined four coordinate time scales for astronomical applications:

- Barycentric Coordinate Time (TCB): Based on a frame comoving with the barycenter of the Solar System. It is used to compute planetary and Solar System dynamics. Because of gravitational and kinetic time dilation, TCB advances faster than Earth-surface clocks by about 0.5 seconds per year.
- Barycentric Dynamical Time (TDB): A scaled version of TCB designed for observational convenience from Earth. TDB remains within 2 milliseconds of Terrestrial Time for several millennia, though its unit rate relative to an ideal infinite observer is scaled by $1 - L_B$ (where $L_B \approx 1.550519768 \times 10^{-8}$).
- Geocentric Coordinate Time (TCG): Based on a frame comoving with the Geocenter (center of the Earth). TCG is used for computations involving Earth-centered phenomena, such as satellite orbits and planetary rotation. Due to gravitational potential at Earth's surface, TCG advances faster than Earth-bound atomic clocks.
- Terrestrial Time (TT): A scaled version of TCG defined such that its unit rate on the geoid equals the SI second. Relative to TCG, the rate of TT is scaled down by $1 - L_G$ (where $L_G \approx 6.969290134 \times 10^{-10}$).

== See also ==
- Absolute time and space
- Introduction to the mathematics of general relativity
