= Barycentric Coordinate Time =

Time standard for calculations pertaining to orbits

Barycentric Coordinate Time (TCB, from the French Temps-coordonnée barycentrique) is a coordinate time standard intended to be used as the independent variable of time for all calculations pertaining to orbits of planets, asteroids, comets, and interplanetary spacecraft in the Solar System. It is equivalent to the proper time experienced by a clock at rest in a coordinate frame co-moving with the barycenter (center of mass) of the Solar System: that is, a clock that performs exactly the same movements as the Solar System but is outside the system's gravity well. It is therefore not influenced by the gravitational time dilation caused by the Sun and the rest of the system. TCB is the time coordinate for the Barycentric Celestial Reference System (BCRS).

TCB was defined in 1991 by the International Astronomical Union, in Recommendation III of the XXIst General Assembly. It was intended as one of the replacements for the problematic 1976 definition of Barycentric Dynamical Time (TDB). Unlike former astronomical time scales, TCB is defined in the context of the general theory of relativity. The relationships between TCB and other relativistic time scales are defined with fully general relativistic metrics. The transformation between TCB and Geocentric Coordinate Time (TCG) may be approximated with an uncertainty not larger than $5\times 10^{-18}$ in rate as:

$$\begin{align}
TCB-TCG & = c^{-2} \left[ \int_{t_0}^t \left(\frac{v_E^2}{2} + w_{0ext}(\mathbf{x}_E)\right) dt + v_E^i r_E^i \right] \\
& - c^{-4} \left[ \int_{t_0}^t \left(-\frac{1}{8} v_E^4 -\frac{3}{2} v_E^2 w_{0ext}(\mathbf{x}_E) + 4 v_E^i w_{ext}^i (\mathbf{x}_E) +\frac{1}{2} w_{0ext}^2(\mathbf{x}_E) \right) dt \right. \\
& \qquad \qquad \left. -\left (3 w_{0ext}(\mathbf{x}_E) + \frac{v_E^2}{2}\right)v_E^i r_E^i \right]
\end{align}$$
where $x^i_E$ and $v^i_E$ are the barycentric coordinate position and velocity of the geocenter, $r^i_E = x^i-x^i_E$ with $x^i$ the barycentric position of the observer, $t=TCB$, $t_0$ is the origin of TCB and TCG defined so that 1977 January 1, 00:00:00 TAI is 1977 January 1, 00:00:32.184 TCG / TCB, $w_{0ext}(\mathbf{x}_E)$ is the sum $\scriptstyle \sum_A \frac{G M_A}{r_A}$ of gravitational potentials for all solar system bodies apart from the Earth evaluated at the geocenter, and $w^i_{ext}(\mathbf{x}_E)$ is similarly the sum $\scriptstyle \sum_A \frac{G M_A}{r_A} v^i_A$. The approximation discards higher powers of $r_E^i$ as they have been found to be negligible.

Because the reference frame for TCB is not influenced by the gravitational potential caused by the Solar System, TCB ticks faster than clocks on the surface of the Earth by 1.550505 × 10^{−8} (about 490 milliseconds per year). Consequently, the values of physical constants to be used with calculations using TCB differ from the traditional values of physical constants (The traditional values were in a sense wrong, incorporating corrections for the difference in time scales). Adapting the large body of existing software to change from TDB to TCB is an ongoing task, and as of 2002 many calculations continued to use TDB in some form.

Time coordinates on the TCB scale are specified conventionally using traditional means of specifying days, inherited from slightly non-uniform time standards based on the rotation of the Earth. Specifically, both Julian Dates and the Gregorian calendar are used. For continuity with its predecessor Ephemeris Time, TCB was set to match ET at around Julian Date 2443144.5 (1977-01-01T00Z). More precisely, it was defined that TCB instant 1977-01-01T00:00:32.184 corresponds exactly to the International Atomic Time (TAI) instant 1977-01-01T00:00:00.000, at the geocenter. This is also the instant at which TAI introduced corrections for gravitational time dilation.

== See also ==
- Terrestrial Time
