= Newcomb's Tables of the Sun =

Book by Simon Newcomb

Newcomb's Tables of the Sun (full title Tables of the Motion of the Earth on its Axis and Around the Sun) (Note: Tables of the Sun is the short title and running head, appearing at the top of all left-hand pages.) is a work by the American astronomer and mathematician Simon Newcomb, published in volume VI of the serial publication Astronomical Papers Prepared for the Use of the American Ephemeris and Nautical Almanac. The work contains Newcomb's mathematical development of the position of the Earth in the Solar System, which is constructed from classical celestial mechanics as well as centuries of astronomical measurements. The bulk of the work, however, is a collection of tabulated precomputed values that provide the position of the sun at any point in time.

Newcomb's Tables were the basis for practically all ephemerides of the Sun published from 1900 through 1983, including the annual almanacs of the U.S. Naval Observatory and the Royal Greenwich Observatory. The physical tables themselves were used by the ephemerides from 1900 to 1959, computerized versions were used from 1960 to 1980, and evaluations of the Newcomb's theories were used from 1981 to 1983. The tables are seldom used now; since the Astronomical Almanac for 1984 they have been superseded by more accurate numerically-integrated ephemerides developed at the Jet Propulsion Laboratory, based on much more accurate observations than were available to Newcomb. Also, the tables did not account for the effects of general relativity which was unknown at the time. Nevertheless, his tabulated values remain accurate to within a few seconds of arc to this day.

He developed similar formulas and tables for the planets Mercury, Venus, Mars, Uranus and Neptune; those of the inner planets have proved to be the most accurate.

== Expressions ==
Certain expressions have been cited in a number of other works over a long period, and are listed below. Newcomb assigns the symbol T to the time since "1900, Jan. 0, Greenwich Mean noon", measured in Julian centuries of 36,525 days.

=== Sun's geometric mean longitude ===
The Sun's geometric mean longitude, freed from aberration is given as

L = 279° 41' 48.04" + 129 602 768.13" T + 1.089" T^{2}

Authors citing this expression include Borkowski (p. 12) and the Nautical Almanac Offices of the United Kingdom and United States (p. 98).

=== Fictitious mean Sun ===
Newcomb gives the Right ascension of the fictitious mean Sun, affected by aberration (which is used in finding mean solar time) as

τ = 18^{h} 38^{m} 45.836^{s} + 8640184.542^{s} T + 0.0929^{s} T^{2}

Authors citing this expression include McCarthy & Seidelmann (p. 13) and the Nautical Almanac Offices of the United Kingdom and United States (p. 73).

== Discontinuance ==
By 1970 the astronomical community recognized the need for improved ephemerides, which are used to prepare national almanacs. The changes required were

- a new fundamental catalog of stars to replace FK4
- the use of improved values of astronomical constants that had been discovered
- a better definition and practical realization of ephemeris time which would take advantage of atomic time
- a new epoch to replace 1950.0

It was decided to introduce as many changes as possible at one time in a consistent system, and the new system would go into effect for the 1984 edition of the ephemerides. "The majority of the resolutions were prepared and adopted by the General Assembly of the IAU at the 1976 and 1979 meetings."

The new fundamental ephemeris was prepared by the Jet Propulsion Laboratory and named DE200/LE200. It uses numerical integration.

== Works cited ==
- Borkowski, K. M. "The Tropical Year and Solar Calendar". Journal of the Royal Astronomical Society of Canada 85 no. 3 (1990): 121–130.
- McCarthy, D. D. & Seidelmann, P. K. TIME from Earth Rotation to Atomic Physics. (Weinheim: Wiley-VCH, 2009).
- [U.S.] Nautical Almanac Office and HM Nautical Almanac Office. "The Improved IAU System", a supplement bound with The Astronomical Almanac for the Year 1984. (Washington and London: U.S. Government Printing Office and Her Majesty's Stationery Office, 1983).
- Nautical Almanac Offices of the United Kingdom and United States of America. Explanatory Supplement to the Ephemeris. (London: Her Majesty's Stationery Office, 1961).
- Newcomb, Simon. Tables of the Four Inner Planets, 2nd ed. (Washington: Bureau of Equipment, Navy Dept., 1898).
