= Dennis McCarthy (scientist) =

American scientist

Dennis D. McCarthy is a former director of time at the United States Naval Observatory. McCarthy also works for the International Earth Rotation and Reference Systems Service. In recognition of his work on Global Positioning System (GPS) satellite navigation, McCarthy was inducted into the Naval Oceanography Hall of Fame on 6 April 2023 at a ceremony hosted by the U.S. Naval Observatory.

== Selected publications ==
=== Books ===
- McCarthy, Dennis D.; Pilkington, John D.H. (1979). Time and the Earth's Rotation. Springer Netherlands. ISBN 978-90-277-0892-2.
- McCarthy, Dennis D.; Carter, William E., eds. (1990). Variations in Earth Rotation. American Geophysical Union. ISBN 978-0-87590-459-7.
- McCarthy, Dennis D.; Seidelmann, P. Kenneth (2009). Time: From Earth Rotation to Atomic Physics. Wiley. ISBN 978-3-527-62795-0.
  - 2nd edition. Cambridge University Press. 2018. ISBN 978-1107197282.

=== Papers ===
- McCarthy, Dennis D.; Babcock, Alice K. (November 1986). "The length of day since 1656". Physics of the Earth and Planetary Interiors. 44 (3): 281–292. Bibcode:1986PEPI...44..281M. doi:10.1016/0031-9201(86)90077-4. ISSN 0031-9201.
- McCarthy, Dennis D.; Luzum, Brian J. (March 1991). "Prediction of Earth orientation". Bulletin Géodésique. 65 (1): 18–21. Bibcode:1991BGeod..65...18M. doi:10.1007/BF00806338. ISSN 0007-4632.
- McCarthy, Dennis D.; Luzum, Brian J. (May 1996). "Path of the Mean Rotational Pole From 1899 to 1994". Geophysical Journal International. 125 (2): 623–629. Bibcode:1996GeoJI.125..623M. doi:10.1111/j.1365-246X.1996.tb00024.x. eISSN 1365-246X. ISSN 0956-540X.
- McCarthy, Dennis D.; Hackman, Christine; Nelson, Robert A. (7 October 2008). "The Physical Basis of the Leap Second". The Astronomical Journal. 136 (5): 1906–1908. Bibcode:2008AJ....136.1906M. doi:10.1088/0004-6256/136/5/1906. eISSN 1538-3881. ISSN 0004-6256.
