= Gravitational time dilation =

General-relativistic effect

Gravitational time dilation is a form of time dilation, an actual difference of elapsed time between two events, as measured by observers situated at varying distances from a gravitating mass. The lower the gravitational potential (the closer the clock is to the source of gravitation), the slower time passes, speeding up as the gravitational potential increases (the clock moving away from the source of gravitation). Albert Einstein originally predicted this in his theory of relativity, and it has since been confirmed by tests of general relativity.

This effect has been demonstrated by noting that atomic clocks at differing altitudes (and thus different gravitational potential) will eventually show different times. The effects detected in such Earth-bound experiments are extremely small, with differences being measured in nanoseconds. Relative to Earth's age in billions of years, Earth's core is in effect 2.5 years younger than its surface. Demonstrating larger effects would require measurements at greater distances from the Earth, or a larger gravitational source.

Gravitational time dilation was first described by Albert Einstein in 1907 as a consequence of special relativity in accelerated frames of reference. In general relativity, it is considered to be a difference in the passage of proper time at different positions as described by a metric tensor of spacetime. The existence of gravitational time dilation was first confirmed directly by the Pound–Rebka experiment in 1959, and later refined by Gravity Probe A and other experiments.

Gravitational time dilation is closely related to gravitational redshift, in which the closer a body emitting light of constant frequency is to a gravitating body, the more its time is slowed by gravitational time dilation, and the lower (more "redshifted") the frequency of the emitted light would seem, as measured by a fixed observer.

== Definition ==
Clocks that are far from massive bodies (or at higher gravitational potentials) run more quickly, and clocks close to massive bodies (or at lower gravitational potentials) run more slowly. For example, considered over the total time-span of Earth (4.6 billion years), a clock set in a geostationary position at an altitude of 9,000 meters above sea level, such as perhaps at the top of Mount Everest (prominence 8,848 m), would be about 39 hours ahead of a clock set at sea level. This is because gravitational time dilation is manifested in accelerated frames of reference or, by virtue of the equivalence principle, in the gravitational field of massive objects.

According to general relativity, inertial mass and gravitational mass are the same, and all accelerated reference frames (such as a uniformly rotating reference frame with its proper time dilation) are physically equivalent to a gravitational field of the same strength.

Consider a family of observers along a straight "vertical" line, each of whom experiences a distinct constant g-force directed along this line (e.g., a long accelerating spacecraft, a skyscraper, a shaft on a planet). Let $g(h)$ be the dependence of g-force on "height", a coordinate along the aforementioned line. The equation with respect to a base observer at $h=0$ is

$$T_d(h) = \exp\left[\frac{1}{c^2}\int_0^h g(h') dh'\right]$$

where $T_d(h)$ is the total time dilation at a distant position $h$, $g(h)$ is the dependence of g-force on "height" $h$, $c$ is the speed of light, and $\exp$ denotes exponentiation by e.

For simplicity, in a Rindler's family of observers in a flat spacetime, the dependence would be

$g(h) = c^2/(H+h)$

with constant $H$, which yields

$$T_d(h) = e^{\ln (H+h) - \ln H} = \tfrac{H+h}H$$.

On the other hand, when $g$ is nearly constant and $gh$ is much smaller than $c^2$, the linear "weak field" approximation $T_d = 1 + gh/c^2$ can also be used.

See Ehrenfest paradox for application of the same formula to a rotating reference frame in flat spacetime.

== Outside a non-rotating sphere ==
A common equation used to determine gravitational time dilation is derived from the Schwarzschild metric, which describes spacetime in the vicinity of a non-rotating massive spherically symmetric object. The equation is

$$t_0 = t_f \sqrt{1 - \frac{2GM}{rc^2}} = t_f \sqrt{1 - \frac{r_{\rm s}}{r}} = t_f \sqrt{1 - \frac{v_e^2}{c^2}} = t_f \sqrt{1 - \beta_e^2} < t_f$$

where

- $t_0$ is the proper time between two events for an observer close to the massive sphere, i.e. deep within the gravitational field
- $t_f$ is the coordinate time between the events for an observer at an arbitrarily large distance from the massive object (this assumes the far-away observer is using Schwarzschild coordinates, a coordinate system where a clock at infinite distance from the massive sphere would tick at one second per second of coordinate time, while closer clocks would tick at less than that rate),
- $G$ is the gravitational constant,
- $M$ is the mass of the object creating the gravitational field,
- $r$ is the radial coordinate of the observer within the gravitational field (this coordinate is analogous to the classical distance from the center of the object, but is actually a Schwarzschild coordinate; the equation in this form has real solutions for $r > r_{\rm s}$),
- $c$ is the speed of light,
- $r_{\rm s} = 2GM/c^2$ is the Schwarzschild radius of $M$,
- $v_e = \sqrt{ \frac{2 G M}{r} }$ is the escape velocity, and
- $\beta_e = v_e/c$ is the escape velocity, expressed as a fraction of the speed of light c.

To illustrate then, without accounting for the effects of rotation, proximity to Earth's gravitational well will cause a clock on the planet's surface to accumulate around 0.0219 fewer seconds over a period of one year than would a distant observer's clock. In comparison, a clock on the surface of the Sun will accumulate around 66.4 fewer seconds in one year.

== Circular orbits ==
In the Schwarzschild metric, free-falling objects can be in circular orbits if the orbital radius is larger than $\tfrac{3}{2} r_s$ (the radius of the photon sphere). The formula for a clock at rest is given above; the formula below gives the general relativistic time dilation for a clock in a circular orbit:

$$t_0 = t_f \sqrt{1 - \frac{3}{2} \! \cdot \! \frac{r_{\rm s}}{r}}\, .$$

Both dilations are shown in the figure below.

== Important features of gravitational time dilation ==
- According to the general theory of relativity, gravitational time dilation is copresent with the existence of an accelerated reference frame. Additionally, all physical phenomena in similar circumstances undergo time dilation equally according to the equivalence principle used in the general theory of relativity.
- The speed of light in a locale is always equal to c according to the observer who is there. That is, every infinitesimal region of spacetime may be assigned its own proper time, and the speed of light according to the proper time at that region is always c. This is the case whether or not a given region is occupied by an observer. A time delay can be measured for photons which are emitted from Earth, bend near the Sun, travel to Venus, and then return to Earth along a similar path. There is no violation of the constancy of the speed of light here, as any observer observing the speed of photons in their region will find the speed of those photons to be c, while the speed at which we observe light travel finite distances in the vicinity of the Sun will differ from c.
- If an observer is able to track the light in a remote, distant locale which intercepts a remote, time dilated observer nearer to a more massive body, that first observer tracks that both the remote light and that remote time dilated observer have a slower time clock than other light which is coming to the first observer at c, like all other light the first observer really can observe (at their own location). If the other, remote light eventually intercepts the first observer, it too will be measured at c by the first observer.
- Gravitational time dilation $T$ in a gravitational well is equal to the velocity time dilation for a speed that is needed to escape that gravitational well (given that the metric is of the form $g=(dt/T(x))^2-g_{space}$, i. e. it is time invariant and there are no "movement" terms $dxdt$). To show that, one can apply Noether's theorem to a body that freely falls into the well from infinity. Then the time invariance of the metric implies conservation of the quantity $g(v,dt)=v^0/T^2$, where $v^0$ is the time component of the 4-velocity $v$ of the body. At the infinity $g(v,dt)=1$, so $v^0=T^2$, or, in coordinates adjusted to the local time dilation, $v^0_{loc}=T$; that is, time dilation due to acquired velocity (as measured at the falling body's position) equals to the gravitational time dilation in the well the body fell into. Applying this argument more generally one gets that (under the same assumptions on the metric) the relative gravitational time dilation between two points equals to the time dilation due to velocity needed to climb from the lower point to the higher.

== Experimental confirmation ==
Satellite clocks are slowed by their orbital speed, but accelerated by their distance out of Earth's gravitational well.

Gravitational time dilation has been experimentally measured using atomic clocks on airplanes, such as the Hafele–Keating experiment. The clocks aboard the airplanes were slightly faster than clocks on the ground. The effect is significant enough that the Global Positioning System's artificial satellites had their atomic clocks permanently corrected.

Additionally, time dilations due to height differences of less than one metre have been experimentally verified in the laboratory.

Gravitational time dilation in the form of gravitational redshift has also been confirmed by the Pound–Rebka experiment and observations of the spectra of the white dwarf Sirius B.

Gravitational time dilation has been measured in experiments with time signals sent to and from the Viking 1 Mars lander.

== See also ==
- Curved spacetime
- Clock hypothesis
- Gravitational redshift
- Hafele–Keating experiment
- Relative velocity time dilation
- Twin paradox
- Barycentric Coordinate Time
