= Meton of Athens =

5th century BC Greek astronomer

- Born: Greece
- Died: Greece
- Occupations: Mathematician, astronomer, geometer, engineer

Meton of Athens (Greek: Μέτων ὁ Ἀθηναῖος; gen.: Μέτωνος) was a Greek mathematician, astronomer, geometer, and engineer who lived in Athens in the 5th century BC. He is best known for calculations involving the eponymous 19-year Metonic cycle, which he introduced in 432 BC into the lunisolar Attic calendar. Euphronios says that Colonus was Meton's deme.

== Work ==
The Metonic calendar incorporates knowledge that 19 solar years and 235 lunar months are very nearly of the same duration. Consequently, a given day of a lunar month will often occur on the same day of the solar year as it did 19 years previously. Meton's observations were made in collaboration with Euctemon, about whom nothing else is known. The Greek astronomer Callippus expanded on the work of Meton, proposing what is now called the Callippic cycle. A Callippic cycle runs for 76 years, or four Metonic cycles. Callippus refined the lunisolar calendar, deducting one day from the fourth Metonic cycle in each Callippic cycle (i.e., after 940 synodic lunar periods had elapsed), so as to better keep the lunisolar calendar synchronized with the seasons of the solar year.

The world's oldest known astronomical calculator, the Antikythera Mechanism (2nd century BC), performs calculations based on both the Metonic and Callipic calendar cycles, with separate dials for each.

The foundations of Meton's observatory in Athens are still visible just behind the podium of the Pnyx, the ancient parliament. Meton found the dates of equinoxes and solstices by observing sunrise from his observatory. From that point of observation, during the summer solstice, sunrise was in line with the local hill of Mount Lycabetus, while six months later, during the winter solstice, sunrise occurs over the high brow of Mount Hymettos in the southeast. So from Meton's observatory the Sun appears to move along a 60° arc between these two points on the horizon every six months. The bisector of the observatory's solstitial arc lies in line with the Acropolis. These topological features are important because the summer solstice was the point in time from which the Athenians measured the start of their calendar years. The first month of the new year, Hekatombaion, began with the first new moon after the summer solstice.

Meton appears briefly as a character in Aristophanes' play The Birds (414 BC). He comes on stage carrying surveying instruments and is described as a geometer.

What little is known about Meton is related by ancient historians. According to Ptolemy, a stela or table erected in Athens contained a record of Meton's observations, and a description of the Metonic cycle. None of Meton's works survive.
