= Callippic cycle =

Astronomical cycle lasting 76 years

The Callippic cycle (or Calippic) is a particular approximate common multiple of the tropical year, the synodic month and the day, proposed by Callippus in 330 BC. It is a period of 76 years, as an improvement of the 19-year Metonic cycle.

== Description ==
A century before Callippus, Meton had described a cycle in which 19 years equals 235 lunations, and judged it to be 6,940 days. This exceeds 235 lunations by almost a third of a day, and 19 tropical years by four tenths of a day. It implicitly gave the solar year a duration of 6940/19 = 365 + 5/19 = 365 + 1/4 + 1/76 days = 365 d 6 h 18 min 56 s.

Callippus accepted the 19-year cycle, but held that the duration of the year was more closely 365 1/4 days (= 365 d 6 h), so he multiplied the 19-year cycle by 4 to obtain an integer number of days, and then omitted 1 day from the last 19-year cycle. Thus, he computed a cycle of 76 years that consists of 940 lunations and 27,759 days, which has been named the Callippic cycle after him. The cycle's error has been computed as one full day in 553 years, or 4.95 parts per million.

The first year of the first Callippic cycle began at the summer solstice of 330 BC (28 June in the proleptic Julian calendar), and was subsequently used by later astronomers. In Ptolemy's Almagest, for example, he cites (Almagest VII 3, H25) observations by Timocharis during the 47th year of the first Callippic cycle (283 BC), when on the eighth of Anthesterion, the Pleiades star cluster was occulted by the Moon.

The Callippic calendar originally used the names of months from the Attic calendar. Later astronomers, such as Hipparchus, preferred other calendars, including the ancient Egyptian calendar. Also Hipparchus invented his own Hipparchic calendar cycle as an improvement upon the Callippic cycle. Ptolemy's Almagest provided some conversions between the Callippic and Egyptian calendars, such as that Anthesterion 8, 47th year of the first Callippic period was equivalent to day 29 of the month of Athyr, during year 465 of Nabonassar. However, the original, complete form of the Callippic calendar is no longer known.

== Equivalents ==
One Callippic cycle corresponds to:

- 940 synodic months
- 1,020.084 draconic months
- 80.084 eclipse years (160 eclipse seasons)
- 1,007.410 anomalistic months

The 80 eclipse years means that if there is a solar eclipse (or lunar eclipse), then after one callippic cycle a New Moon (resp. Full Moon) will take place at the same node of the orbit of the Moon, and under these circumstances another eclipse can occur.
