= Metonic cycle =

19 solar year recurrence of lunar phases

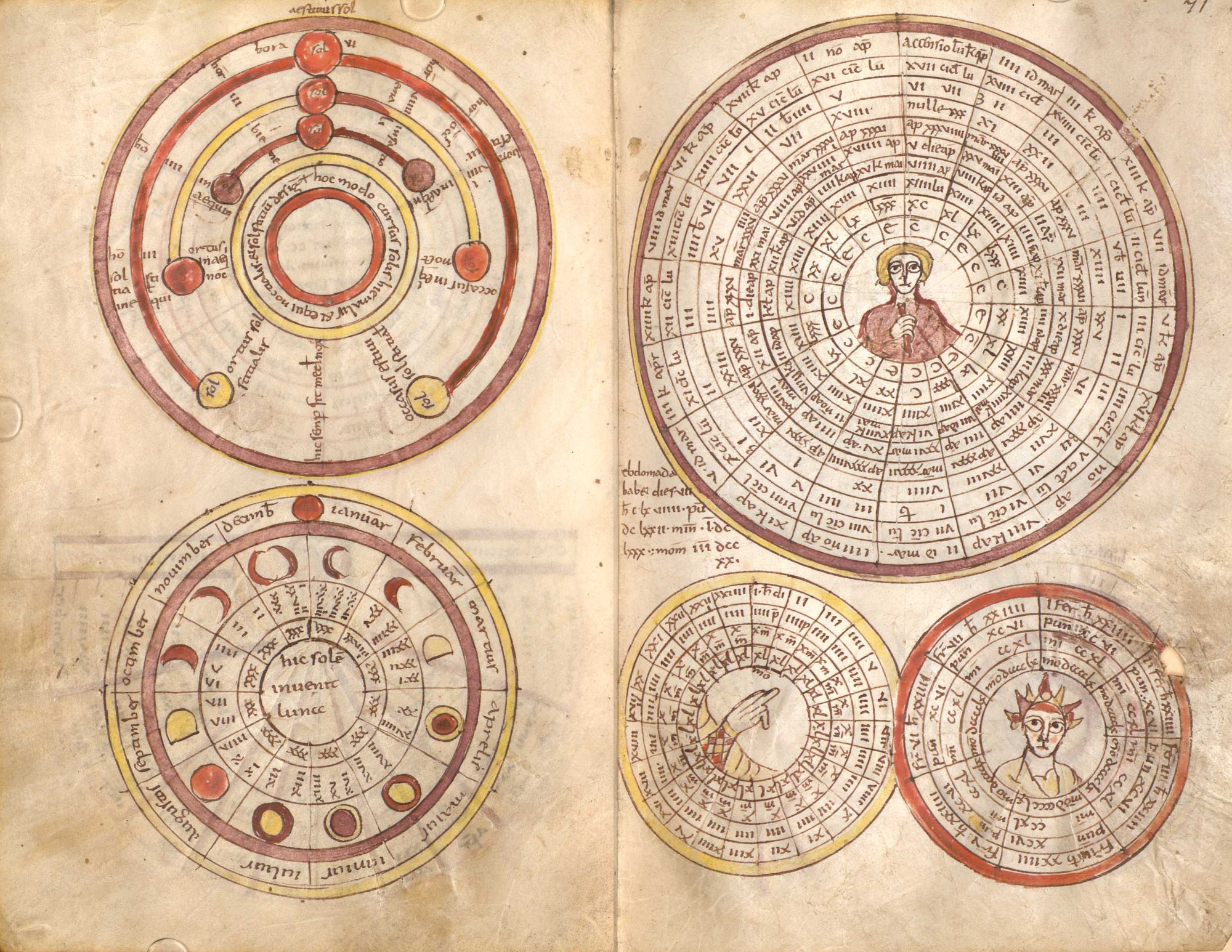
Depiction of the 19 years of the Metonic cycle as a wheel, with the Julian date of the Easter New Moon, from a 9th-century computistic manuscript made in St. Emmeram's Abbey (Clm 14456, fol. 71r)

For example, by the 19-year Metonic cycle, the full moon repeats on or near Christmas between 1711 and 2300. A small horizontal libration is visible comparing their appearances. A red color shows full moons that are also lunar eclipses.

The Metonic cycle or enneadecaeteris (from Ancient Greek: ἐννεακαιδεκαετηρίς, from ἐννεακαίδεκα, "nineteen") is a period of almost exactly 19 years after which the lunar phases recur at the same time of the year. The recurrence is not perfect, and by precise observation the Metonic cycle defined as 235 synodic months is just 2 hours, 4 minutes and 58 seconds longer than 19 tropical years. Meton of Athens, in the 5th century BC, judged the cycle to be a whole number of days, 6,940. Using these whole numbers facilitates the construction of a lunisolar calendar.

A tropical year (about 365.24 days) is longer than 12 lunar months (about 354.36 days) and shorter than 13 of them (about 383.90 days). In a Metonic calendar (a type of lunisolar calendar), there are twelve years of 12 lunar months and seven years of 13 lunar months.

== Application in traditional calendars ==
In the Babylonian and Hebrew lunisolar calendars, the years 3, 6, 8, 11, 14, 17, and 19 are the long (13-month) years of the Metonic cycle. This cycle forms the basis of the Greek and Hebrew calendars. A 19-year cycle is used for the computation of the date of Easter each year.

The Babylonians applied the 19-year cycle from the late sixth century BC.

According to Livy, the second king of Rome, Numa Pompilius (reigned 715–673 BC), inserted intercalary months in such a way that "in the twentieth year the days should fall in with the same position of the sun from which they had started". As "the twentieth year" takes place nineteen years after "the first year", this seems to indicate that the Metonic cycle was applied to Numa's calendar.

Diodorus Siculus reports that Apollo is said to have visited the Hyperboreans once every 19 years.

The Metonic cycle was implemented in the 2nd century BC Antikythera mechanism, which offers unexpected evidence for the popularity of the calendar based on it.

The (19-year) Metonic cycle is a lunisolar cycle, as is the (76-year) Callippic cycle. An important example of an application of the Metonic cycle in the Julian calendar is the 19-year lunar cycle insofar as provided with a Metonic structure. Meton introduced the 19 year cycle to the Attic calendar in 432 BC. In the following century, Callippus developed the Callippic cycle of four 19-year periods for a 76-year cycle with a mean year of exactly 365.25 days.

Around AD 260 the Alexandrian computist Anatolius, who became bishop of Laodicea in AD 268, was the first to devise a method for determining the date of Easter Sunday. However, it was some later, somewhat different, version of the Metonic 19-year lunar cycle which, as the basic structure of Dionysius Exiguus' and also of Bede's Easter table, would ultimately prevail throughout Christendom, at least until in the year 1582, when the Gregorian calendar was introduced.

The Coligny calendar is a Celtic lunisolar calendar using the Metonic cycle. The bronze plaque on which it was found dates from c. AD 200, but the internal evidence points to the calendar itself being several centuries older, created in the Iron Age or late Bronze Age.

The Metonic cycle is thought to be numerically encoded on the Berlin Gold Hat from central Europe, dating from c. 1000-800 BC.

The Runic calendar is a perpetual calendar based on the 19-year-long Metonic cycle. It is also known as a Rune staff or Runic Almanac. This calendar does not rely on knowledge of the duration of the tropical year or of the occurrence of leap years. It is set at the beginning of each year by observing the first full moon after the winter solstice. The oldest one known, and the only one from the Middle Ages, is the Nyköping staff, which is believed to date from the 13th century.

The Bahá'í calendar, established during the middle of the 19th century, is also based on cycles of 19 solar years.

=== Hebrew calendar ===
A Small Maḥzor (Hebrew מחזור, pronounced [maχˈzor], meaning "cycle") is a 19-year cycle in the lunisolar calendar system used by the Jewish people. It is similar to, but slightly different in usage from, the Greek Metonic cycle (being based on a month of 29 13753/25920 days, giving a cycle of 6939 3575/5184 ≈ 6939.69 days (Note: The month is 29.5 days and 793 "parts", where a part is 1/18 of a minute. Tøndering, Trine; Tøndering, Claus. "Calendar FAQ: the Hebrew calendar: New moon". This comes to 29 13753/25920 days. Multiplying this by 235 gives the length of the cycle.)), and likely derived from or alongside the much earlier Babylonian calendar.

=== Polynesia ===
It is possible that the Polynesian kilo-hoku (astronomers) discovered the Metonic cycle in the same way Meton had, by trying to make the month fit the year.

== Mathematical basis ==
The Metonic cycle is the most accurate cycle of time (in a timespan of less than 100 years) for synchronizing the tropical year and the lunar month (synodic month), when the method of synchronizing is the intercalation of a thirteenth lunar month in a calendar year from time to time. The traditional lunar year of 12 synodic months is about 354 days, approximately eleven days short of the solar year. Thus, every 2 to 3 years there is a discrepancy of 22 to 33 days, or a full synodic month. For example, if the winter solstice and the new moon coincide, it takes 19 tropical years for the coincidence to recur. The mathematical logic is this:

- A tropical year lasts 365.2422 days.
  a span of 19 tropical years (365.2422 × 19) lasts 6,939.602 days

That duration is almost the same as 235 synodic months:

- A synodic month lasts 29.53059 days.
  a span of 235 synodic months (29.53059 × 235) lasts 6,939.689 days

Thus the algorithm is correct to 0.087 days (2 hours, 5 minutes and 16 seconds).

For a lunisolar calendar to 'catch up' to this discrepancy and thus maintain seasonal consistency, seven intercalary months are added (one at a time), at intervals of every 2–3 years during the course of 19 solar years. Thus twelve of those years have 12 lunar months and seven have 13 months. Of these months, 125 were full (30 days) and 110 were deficient (29 days), to give a total of 6940 days.

== See also ==
- Attic and Byzantine calendar
- Callippic cycle (76-year cycle from 330 BC)
- Date of Easter ("the Computus")
- Hipparchic cycle (304-year cycle from 2nd century BC)
- Intercalation (timekeeping)
- Julian day
- Octaeteris (8-year cycle of antiquity)
- Saros cycle of eclipses
