= Tzolkinex =

Eclipse cycle equal to a period of two saros cycles

The tzolkinex is an eclipse cycle equal to a period of two saros (13,170.636 days) minus one inex (10,571.946 days). As consecutive eclipses in an inex series belongs to the next consecutive saros series, each consecutive tzolkinex belongs to the previous saros series.

The tzolkinex is equal to 2598.691 days (about 7 years, 1 month and 12 days). It is related to the tritos in that a period of one tritos plus one tzolkinex is exactly equal to one saros. It is also related to the inex in that a period of one inex plus one tzolkinex is exactly equal to two saros.

It corresponds to:

- 88 synodic months
- 95.49723 draconic months
- 7.49723 eclipse years (15 eclipse seasons)
- 94.31081 anomalistic months.

Because of the non-integer number of anomalistic month each eclipse varies in type, i.e. total vs. annular, and greatly varies in length. From remainder of 0.31081, being near 1/3, every third tzolkinex comes close to an even number of anomalistic months, but occurs during a different season, and in the opposite hemisphere, thus they may be of the same type (annular vs. total) but otherwise do not have a similar character.

== Details ==
It was first studied by George van den Bergh (1951). The name was suggested by Felix Verbelen (2001) because its length is nearly 10 Tzolk'ins (260-day periods).

It alternates hemispheres with each cycle, occurring at alternating nodes, each successive occurrence is one saros less than the last.

Now					One lunar year earlier				
Date	Saros	Gamma	Magnitude	Graph	Date	Saros	Gamma	Magnitude	Graph
1971 Feb 25	149	1.12	0.79		1970 Mar 07	139	0.45	1.04	
1978 Apr 07	148	-1.11	0.79		1977 Apr 18	138	-0.40	0.95	
1985 May 19	147	1.07	0.84		1984 May 30	137	0.28	1.00	
1992 Jun 30	146	-0.75	1.06		1991 Jul 11	136	-0.00	1.08	
1999 Aug 11	145	0.51	1.03		1998 Aug 22	135	-0.26	0.97	
2006 Sep 22	144	-0.41	0.94		2005 Oct 03	134	0.33	0.96	
2013 Nov 03	143	0.32	1.02		2012 Nov 13	133	-0.37	1.05	
2020 Dec 14	142	-0.29	1.03		2019 Dec 26	132	0.41	0.97	
2028 Jan 26	141	0.39	0.92		2027 Feb 06	131	-0.30	0.93	
2035 Mar 09	140	-0.44	0.99		2034 Mar 20	130	0.29	1.05	
2042 Apr 20	139	0.29	1.06		2041 Apr 30	129	-0.44	1.02	
2049 May 31	138	-0.12	0.96		2048 Jun 11	128	0.65	0.94	
2056 Jul 12	137	-0.04	0.99		2055 Jul 24	127	-0.80	1.04	
2063 Aug 24	136	0.28	1.07		2062 Sep 03	126	1.02	0.97	
2070 Oct 04	135	-0.49	0.97		2069 Oct 15	125	-1.25	0.53	
2077 Nov 15	134	0.47	0.94		2076 Nov 26	124	1.14	0.73	
2084 Dec 27	133	-0.41	1.04		2084 Jan 07	123	-1.07	0.87	
2092 Feb 07	132	0.43	0.98		2091 Feb 18	122	1.18	0.66	
2099 Mar 21	131	-0.40	0.93		2098 Apr 01	121	-1.10	0.80	

== See also ==
- Eclipse cycle
