= Sidereal year =

Time taken by the Earth to orbit the Sun once with respect to the fixed stars

A sidereal year (/saɪˈdɪəri.əl/, US also /sɪ-/; from Latin sidus 'asterism, star'), also called a sidereal orbital period, is the time that Earth or another planetary body takes to orbit the Sun once with respect to the fixed stars.

Thus, a sidereal year is the interval required for Earth to travel once around the ecliptic, completing one revolution about the Sun and returning to the same orbital position relative to the background stars.

In 2025, the sidereal year equals 365.256363 ephemeris days (365 days, 6 hours, 9 minutes and 9.8 seconds).

The sidereal year differs from the tropical year, "the period of time required for the ecliptic longitude of the Sun to increase 360 degrees", due to the precession of the equinoxes. The sidereal year is 20 minutes 24.7 seconds longer than the mean tropical year (365.242189 ephemeris days), or 365 days, 5 hours, 48 minutes, 45.1 seconds.

== History ==
Ancient people used the annual motion of the stars relative to the Sun to judge the seasons. For example, in protodynastic Egypt, Sirius, known to them as Sothis, would pass near the Sun, becoming invisible, and would reappear just as the Nile began to rise, heralding the season of inundation. The 12th lunar month was named after Sothis and an intercalary month was inserted as necessary to keep this astronomical event, known as a heliacal rising, within the month of Sothis. This became the basis of the Sothic cycle, used by later scholars to correlate calendar dates.

Hesiod's poem Works and Days, written around 700 BC, advised: "When the Pleiades, daughters of Atlas, are rising, begin your harvest, and your ploughing when they are going to set."

Hipparchus discovered the precession of the equinoxes in 127 BC, and was the first to compare the lengths of the sidereal and tropical year. According to Ptolemy, Hipparchus gave the length of the sidereal year as 365 + 1/4 + 1/144 days (= 365.25694... days = 365 days 6 hours 10 min).

Indian astronomers knew of the precession of equinoxes. The Surya Siddhanta (c. 500-800 AD) gave a precession of 54 arcseconds annually (the modern value is 50 arcseconds), and reported that the sidereal year was 365 days, 6 hours, 12 minutes, 36.56 seconds.

== See also ==
- Anomalistic year
- Gaussian year
- Julian year (astronomy)
- Orbital period
- Precession § Astronomy
- Sidereal time
- Solar calendar
- Tropical year
- Mars time
