= Gaussian year =

Unit of time equaling 365.2568983 days

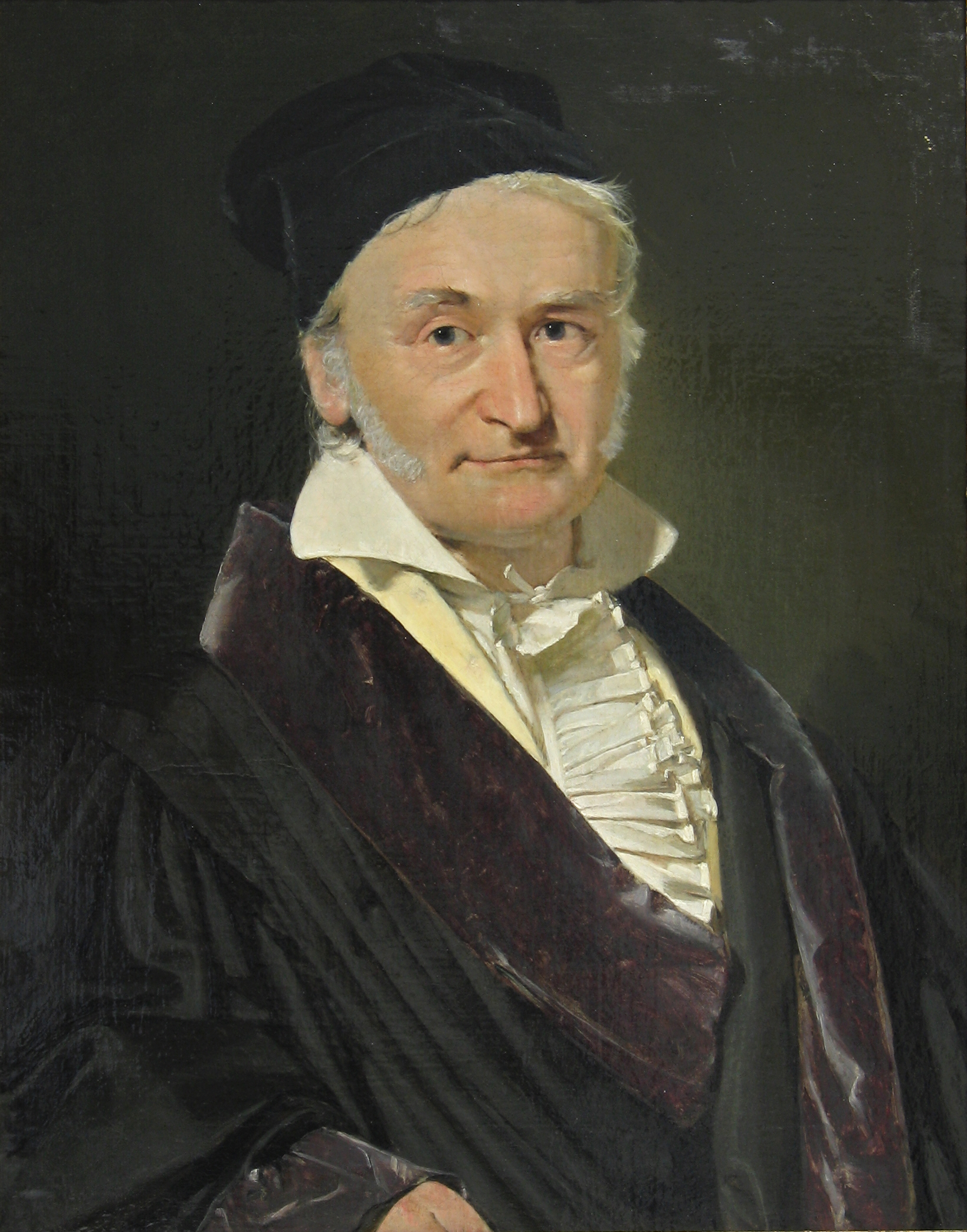
Carl Friedrich Gauss

A Gaussian year is defined as 365.2568983 days. It was adopted by Carl Friedrich Gauss as the length of the sidereal year in his studies of the dynamics of the Solar System. A slightly different value is now accepted as the length of the sidereal year, and the value accepted by Gauss is given a special name.

A particle of negligible mass, that orbits a body of 1 solar mass in this period, has a mean axis for its orbit of 1 astronomical unit by definition. The value is derived from Kepler's third law as

$$\mbox{1 Gaussian year}=  \frac {2\pi} {k} \,$$

where

k is the Gaussian gravitational constant.

== See also ==
- Astronomical unit
- Gregorian year
- List of years
- List of calendars
- Orders of magnitude (time)
