= Wet moon =

Horizontal (bowl appearance) crescent

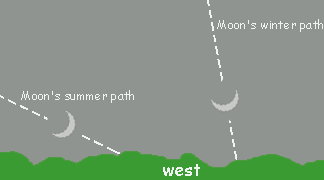
The orbit of a dry moon (left) and wet moon (right)

A wet moon (also called a Cheshire moon) is the visual phenomenon when the "horns" of the crescent Moon point up at an angle, away from the horizon, so that the crescent takes on the appearance of a bowl or smile. A wet moon occurs when the crescent Moon is low above the horizon and at a point more or less directly above the Sun's (invisible) position below the horizon. This in turn is determined by the positions of the Moon and Earth in their respective orbits, the inclinations of these orbits relative to one another and to Earth's celestial equator, and the observer's latitude on Earth. Wet moons occur routinely in the tropics (where the Sun and Moon rise and set nearly vertically), but rarely in the polar regions (where the Sun and Moon rise and set at a glancing angle or not at all).

By contrast, a dry moon is one where the crescent of the moon is at any other angle.

== Name ==
The terms wet moon and dry moon originate from Hawaiian mythology, where it was thought that the Moon appeared as a bowl that would fill up with rainwater. The period when this is most common, January 20 to February 18, corresponds with Kaelo the Water Bearer in Hawaiian astrology and makes the Moon known as the "dripping wet moon". As summer comes, the crescent shape shifts, pouring out the water and causing the summer rains. After the "bowl" empties, it dries out and rights itself, creating the "dry moon". However, others say that this is a wet moon because it permitted the water to pour out.

The term Cheshire moon is a reference to the smile of the Cheshire Cat from Lewis Carroll's novel Alice's Adventures in Wonderland.

== Explanation ==
Approximate moon phases of the moon at selected latitudes at moonrise (at moonset, the orientation is vertically mirrored)

The annual path that the Sun appears to follow against the background of relatively fixed stars is known as the ecliptic. Since the Moon's orbit is inclined 5.14° to the ecliptic, the Moon will always remain within about 5° north or south of the ecliptic. For half of a sidereal month (with respect to the stars), the Moon is either north or south of the ecliptic. The two points where the Moon's orbit intersects that of Earth are called the lunar nodes; at the ascending node, the Moon moves north of the ecliptic, while at the descending node, it moves south. Eclipses occur at these points, hence the name ecliptic. The nodes precess around the ecliptic axis at the rate of one circuit every 18.6 years. The ecliptic makes the steepest angle to the horizon at the equinoxes. Since the crescent Moon appears near the Sun, the crescent would appear to lie on its back when low above the horizon around the equinoxes.

== See also ==
- Blue moon
- Libration
- Lunar precession
- Lunar standstill
- Nodal precession
- Orbit of the Moon
- Orbital node
- Lunar node
