= Nodal period =

The nodal period (or draconic period) of a satellite is the time interval between successive passages of the satellite through either of its orbital nodes, typically the ascending node. This type of orbital period applies to artificial satellites, like those that monitor weather on Earth, and natural satellites like the Moon.

It is distinct from the sidereal period, which measures the period with respect to reference stars seemingly fixed onto a spherical background, since the location of a satellite's nodes precess over time. For example, the nodal period of the Moon is 27.2122 days (one draconic month), while its sidereal period is 27.3217 days (one sidereal month).

== Near-Earth satellites ==
The oblate figure of the Earth has important effects of the orbits of near-Earth satellites. An expression for the nodal period (T_{n}) of a near circular orbit, such that the eccentricity (ε) is almost but not equal to zero, is the following:

$$T_n = \frac{2\pi a^\frac32} {\mu^\frac12} \left( 1 - \frac{3 J_2 \left(4 - 5\sin^2 i\right)}{4\left(\frac{a}{R}\right)^2 \sqrt{1-\varepsilon^2}\left(1+\varepsilon \cos\omega\right)^2} - \frac{3 J_2 \left(1 + \varepsilon\cos\omega\right)^3}{2\left(\frac{a}{R}\right)^2 \left(1-\varepsilon^2\right)^3} \right)$$

where $a$ is the semi-major axis, $\mu$ is the gravitational constant, $J_2$ is a perturbation factor due to the oblateness of the earth, $i$ is the inclination, $R$ is the radius of the earth and $\omega$ is the argument of the perigee.

== See also ==
- Lunar nodal period
