= Longitude of the ascending node =

Defining the orbit of an object in space

The longitude of the ascending node (bright green) as a part of a diagram of orbital parameters.

The longitude of the ascending node, also known as the right ascension of the ascending node, is one of the orbital elements used to specify the orbit of an object in space. Denoted with the symbol Ω, it is the angle from a specified reference direction, called the origin of longitude, to the direction of the ascending node (☊), as measured in a specified reference plane. The ascending node is the point where the orbit of the object passes through the plane of reference, as seen in the adjacent image.

== Types ==
Commonly used reference planes and origins of longitude include:

- For geocentric orbits (e.g., artificial satellites around earth), Earth's equatorial plane as the reference plane, and the First Point of Aries (FPA) as the origin of longitude. In this case, the longitude is also called the right ascension of the ascending node (RAAN). The angle is measured eastwards (or, as seen from the north, counterclockwise) from the FPA to the node. An alternative orbital element to the RAAN is the local time of the ascending node (LTAN), defined as the local mean time at which the spacecraft crosses the equator traveling northward. Similar definitions exist for satellites around other planets (see planetary coordinate systems).
- For heliocentric orbits, the ecliptic as the reference plane, and the FPA as the origin of longitude. The angle is measured counterclockwise (as seen from north of the ecliptic) from the First Point of Aries to the node.
- For orbits outside the Solar System, the plane tangent to the celestial sphere at the point of interest (called the plane of the sky) as the reference plane, and north (i.e. the perpendicular projection of the direction from the observer to the north celestial pole onto the plane of the sky) as the origin of longitude. The angle is measured eastwards (or, as seen by the observer, counterclockwise) from north to the node.^{, pp. 40, 72, 137;}^{, chap. 17.}

In the case of a binary star known only from visual observations, it is not possible to tell which node is ascending and which is descending. In this case the orbital parameter which is recorded is simply labeled longitude of the node, ☊, and represents the longitude of whichever node has a longitude between 0 and 180 degrees.^{, chap. 17;}^{, p. 72.}

== Calculation from state vectors ==
In astrodynamics, the longitude of the ascending node can be calculated from the specific relative angular momentum vector h as follows:

$$\begin{align}
\mathbf{n} &= \mathbf{k} \times \mathbf{h} = (-h_y, h_x, 0) \\
\Omega &= \begin{cases}
\arccos { {n_x} \over { \mathbf{\left |n \right |}}},      &n_y \ge 0; \\
2\pi-\arccos { {n_x} \over { \mathbf{\left |n \right |}}}, &n_y < 0.
\end{cases}
\end{align}$$

Here, n = ⟨n_{x}, n_{y}, n_{z}⟩ is a vector pointing towards the ascending node. The reference plane is assumed to be the xy-plane, and the origin of longitude is taken to be the positive x-axis. k is the unit vector (0, 0, 1), which is the normal vector to the xy reference plane.

For non-inclined orbits (with inclination equal to zero), ☊ is undefined. For computation it is then, by convention, set equal to zero; that is, the ascending node is placed in the reference direction, which is equivalent to letting n point towards the positive x-axis.

== See also ==
- Equinox
- Kepler orbits
- List of orbits
- Orbital node
- Perturbation of the orbital plane can cause precession of the ascending node.
