= Lunar month =

Time between successive new moons

In lunar calendars, a lunar month is the time between two successive syzygies of the same type: new moons or full moons. The precise definition varies, especially for the beginning of the month.

Animation of the Moon as it cycles through its phases, as seen from the Northern Hemisphere. The apparent wobbling of the Moon is known as libration.

== Variations ==
In Shona, Middle Eastern and European traditions, the month starts when the young crescent moon first becomes visible, at evening, after conjunction with the Sun one or two days before that evening (e.g., in the Islamic calendar). In ancient Egypt, the lunar month began on the day when the waning moon could no longer be seen just before sunrise. Others run from full moon to full moon.

Yet others use calculation, of varying degrees of sophistication, for example, the Hebrew calendar, the Chinese calendar, or the ecclesiastical lunar calendar. Calendars count integer days, so months may be 29 or 30 days in length, in some regular or irregular sequence. Lunar cycles are prominent, and calculated with great precision in the ancient Hindu Panchangam calendar, widely used in the Indian subcontinent. In Indonesia, the month from conjunction to conjunction is divided into thirty parts known as tithi. A tithi is between 19 and 26 hours long. The date is named after the tithi ruling at sunrise. When the tithi is shorter than the day, the tithi may jump. This case is called kṣaya or lopa. Conversely a tithi may 'stall' as well, that is – the same tithi is associated with two consecutive days. This is known as vriddhi.

In English common law, a "lunar month" traditionally meant exactly 28 days or four weeks, thus a contract for 12 months ran for exactly 48 weeks. In the United Kingdom, the lunar month was formally replaced by the calendar month for deeds and other written contracts by section 61(a) of the Law of Property Act 1925 and for post-1850 legislation by the Interpretation Act 1978 (Schedule 1 read with sections 5 and 23 and with Schedule 2 paragraph 4(1)(a)) and its predecessors.

== Types ==
There are several types of lunar month. The term lunar month usually refers to the synodic month because it is the cycle of the visible phases of the Moon.

Most of the following types of lunar month, except the distinction between the sidereal and tropical months, were first recognized in Babylonian lunar astronomy.

=== Synodic month ===
The synodic month (Greek: συνοδικός, romanized: synodikós, meaning "pertaining to a synod, i.e., a meeting"; in this case, of the Sun and the Moon), also lunation, is the average period of the Moon's orbit with respect to the line joining the Sun and Earth: 29 (Earth) days, 12 hours, 44 minutes and 2.9 seconds. This is the period of the lunar phases, because the Moon's appearance depends on the position of the Moon with respect to the Sun as seen from Earth. Due to tidal locking, the same hemisphere of the Moon always faces the Earth and thus the length of a lunar day (sunrise to sunrise on the Moon) equals the time that the Moon takes to complete one orbit around Earth, returning to the same lunar phase.

While the Moon is orbiting Earth, Earth is progressing in its orbit around the Sun. After completing its § Sidereal month, the Moon must move a little further to reach the new position having the same angular distance from the Sun, appearing to move with respect to the stars since the previous month. Consequently, at 27 days, 7 hours, 43 minutes and 11.5 seconds, the sidereal month is about 2.2 days shorter than the synodic month. Thus, about 13.37 sidereal months, but about 12.37 synodic months, occur in a Gregorian year.

Since Earth's orbit around the Sun is elliptical and not circular, the speed of Earth's progression around the Sun varies during the year. Thus, the angular velocity is faster nearer periapsis and slower near apoapsis. The same is true (to an even larger extent) for the Moon's orbit around Earth. Because of these two variations in angular rate, the actual time between lunations may vary from about 29.274 days (or 29 d 6 h 35 min) to about 29.829 days (or 29 d 19 h 54 min). The average duration in modern times (mean synodic month) is 29.53059 days or 29 d 12 h 44 min 3 s, with up to seven hours variation about the mean in any given year. (Note: In 2001, the synodic months varied from 29 d 19 h 14 min in January to 29 d 7 h 11 min in July. In 2004 the variations were from 29 d 15 h 35 min in May to 29 d 10 h 34 min in December.) A more precise figure of the average duration may be derived for a specific date using the lunar theory of Chapront-Touzé and Chapront (1988):
29.5305888531 + 0.00000021621T − 3.64×10^{−10}T^{2} where T = (JD − 2451545.0)/36525 and JD is the Julian day number (and JD = 2451545 corresponds to 1 January AD 2000). The duration of synodic months in ancient and medieval history is itself a topic of scholarly study.

=== Sidereal month ===
The period of the Moon's orbit as defined with respect to the celestial sphere of apparently fixed stars (the International Celestial Reference Frame; ICRF) is known as a sidereal month because it is the time it takes the Moon to return to a similar position among the stars (Latin: sidera): 27.321661 days (27 d 7 h 43 min 11.6 s).This type of month has been observed among cultures in the Middle East, India, and China in the following way: they divided the sky into 27 or 28 lunar mansions, one for each day of the month, identified by the prominent star(s) in them.

=== Tropical month ===
Just as the tropical year is based on the amount of time between perceived rotations of the sun around the earth (based on the Greek word τροπή meaning "turn"), the tropical month is the average time between corresponding equinoxes. It is also the average time between successive moments when the moon crosses from the southern celestial hemisphere to the northern (or vice versa), or successive crossing of a given right ascension or ecliptic longitude. The moon rises at the North Pole once every tropical month, and likewise at the South Pole.

It is customary to specify positions of celestial bodies with respect to the First Point of Aries (Sun's location at the March equinox). Because of Earth's precession of the equinoxes, this point moves back slowly along the ecliptic. Therefore, it takes the Moon less time to return to an ecliptic longitude of 0° than to the same point amid the fixed stars. This slightly shorter period, 27.321582 days (27 d 7 h 43 min 4.7 s), is commonly known as the tropical month by analogy with Earth's tropical year.

=== Anomalistic month ===
The Moon's orbit approximates an ellipse rather than a circle. However, the orientation (as well as the shape) of this orbit is not fixed. In particular, the position of the extreme points (the line of the apsides: perigee and apogee), rotates once (apsidal precession) in about 3,233 days (8.85 years). It takes the Moon longer to return to the same apsis because it has moved ahead during one revolution. This longer period is called the anomalistic month and has an average length of 27.554551 days (27 d 13 h 18 min 33.2 s). The apparent diameter of the Moon varies with this period, so this type has some relevance for the prediction of eclipses (see Saros), whose extent, duration, and appearance (whether total or annular) depend on the exact apparent diameter of the Moon. The apparent diameter of the full moon varies with the full moon cycle, which is the beat period of the synodic and anomalistic month, as well as the period after which the apsides point to the Sun again.

An anomalistic month is longer than a sidereal month because the perigee moves in the same direction as the Moon is orbiting the Earth, one revolution in about 8.85 years. Therefore, the Moon takes a little longer to return to perigee than to return to the same star.

=== Draconic month ===
A draconic month or draconitic month (Note: In medieval times, the part of the Moon's orbit south of the ecliptic was known as the 'dragon' (which devoured the Moon during eclipses) and from this we get the terminology 'dragon's head' for the ascending node and 'dragon's tail' for the descending node. … The periods between successive nodes has, over time, been termed the dracontic, draconic and draconitic month, the words deriving from the Greek for 'dragon'.) is also known as a nodal month or nodical month. The name draconic refers to a mythical dragon, said to live in the lunar nodes and eat the Sun or Moon during an eclipse. A solar or lunar eclipse is possible only when the Moon is at or near either of its orbital nodes, the two points where its orbit crosses the ecliptic plane.

The orbit of the Moon lies in a plane that is inclined about 5.14° with respect to the ecliptic plane. The line of intersection of these planes passes through the two points at which the Moon's orbit crosses the ecliptic plane: the ascending node and the descending node.

The draconic or nodical month is the average interval between two successive transits of the Moon through the same node. Because of the torque exerted by the Sun's gravity on the angular momentum of the Earth–Moon system, the plane of the Moon's orbit gradually rotates westward, which means the nodes gradually rotate around Earth. As a result, the time it takes the Moon to return to the same node is shorter than a sidereal month, lasting 27.212220 days (27 d 5 h 5 min 35.8 s). The line of nodes of the Moon's orbit precesses 360° in about 6,793 days (18.6 years).

A draconic month is shorter than a sidereal month because the nodes precess in the opposite direction to that in which the Moon is orbiting Earth, one rotation every 18.6 years. Therefore, the Moon returns to the same node slightly earlier than it returns to meet the same reference star.

== Cycle lengths ==
Regardless of the culture, all lunar calendar months approximate the mean length of the synodic month, the average period the Moon takes to cycle through its phases (new, first quarter, full, last quarter) and back again: 29–30 days. The Moon completes one orbit around Earth every 27.3 days (a sidereal month), but due to Earth's orbital motion around the Sun, the Moon does not yet finish a synodic cycle until it has reached the point in its orbit where the Sun is in the same relative position.

This table lists the average lengths of five types of astronomical lunar month, derived from Chapront, Chapront-Touzé & Francou 2002. These are not constant, so a first-order (linear) approximation of the secular change is provided.

Valid for the epoch J2000.0 (1 January 2000 12:00 TT):

Month type	Length in days
draconitic	27.212220815 + 4.14×10^{−7} × T
tropical	27.321582252 + 1.82×10^{−7} × T
sidereal	27.321661554 + 2.17×10^{−7} × T
anomalistic	27.554549886 − 1.007×10^{−6} × T
synodic	29.530588861 + 2.52×10^{−7} × T

Note: In this table, time is expressed in Ephemeris Time (more precisely Terrestrial Time) with days of 86,400 SI seconds. T is centuries since the epoch (2000), expressed in Julian centuries of 36,525 days. For calendrical calculations, one would probably use days measured in the time scale of Universal Time, which follows the somewhat unpredictable rotation of the Earth, and progressively accumulates a difference with ephemeris time called ΔT ("delta-T").

Apart from the long term (millennial) drift in these values, all these periods vary continually around their mean values because of the complex orbital effects of the Sun and planets affecting its motion.

=== Derivation ===
The periods are derived from polynomial expressions for Delaunay's arguments used in lunar theory, as listed in Table 4 of Chapront, Chapront-Touzé & Francou (2002)

W_{1} is the ecliptic longitude of the Moon with regard to the fixed ICRS equinox: its period is the sidereal month. If we add the rate of precession to the sidereal angular velocity, we get the angular velocity with regard to the equinox of the date: its period is the tropical month (which is rarely used). l is the mean anomaly: its period is the anomalistic month. F is the argument of latitude: its period is the draconic month. D is the elongation of the Moon from the Sun: its period is the synodic month.

Derivation of a period from a polynomial for an argument A (angle):

$A = A_0 + (A_1\times T) + (A_2\times T^2)$;

T in centuries (cy) is 36,525 days from epoch J2000.0.

The angular velocity is the first derivative:

$\operatorname{d}\!A/\operatorname{d}\!t = A' = A_1 + (2\times A_2\times T)$.

The period (Q) is the inverse of the angular velocity:

$Q = {1 \over A'} = {1 \over A_1 + (2\times A_2\times T)} = {1\over A_1} \times {1 \over 1 + (2\times {A_2\over A_1}\times T)} = {1\over A_1} \times (1 - 2\times {A_2\over A_1}\times T) = {1\over A_1} - (2\times {A_2\over(A_1\times A_1)}\times T)$,

ignoring higher-order terms.

A_{1} in ″/cy ; A_{2} in ″/cy^{2}; so the result Q is expressed in cy/″, which is a very inconvenient unit.

1 revolution (rev) is 360° × 60′ × 60″ = 1,296,000″; to convert the unit of the velocity to revolutions/day, divide A_{1} by B_{1} = 1,296,000 × 36,525 = 47,336,400,000; C_{1} = B_{1} ÷ A_{1} is then the period (in days/revolution) at the epoch J2000.0.

For rev/day^{2} divide A_{2} by B_{2} = 1,296,000 × 36,525^{2} = 1,728,962,010,000,000.

For $A_2\div (A_1\times A_1)$ the numerical conversion factor then becomes 2 × B_{1} × B_{1} ÷ B_{2} = 2 × 1,296,000. This would give a linear term in days change (of the period) per day, which is also an inconvenient unit: for change per year multiply by a factor 365.25, and for change per century multiply by a factor 36,525. C_{2} = 2 × 1,296,000 × 36,525 × A_{2} ÷ (A_{1} × A_{1}).

Then period P in days:

$P = C_1 - C_2\times T$.

Example for synodic month, from Delaunay's argument D: D′ = 1602961601.0312 − 2 × 6.8498 × T″/cy; A_{1} = 1602961601.0312″/cy; A_{2} = −6.8498″/cy^{2}; C_{1} = 47,336,400,000 ÷ 1,602,961,601.0312 = 29.530588860986 days; C_{2} = 94,672,800,000 × −6.8498 ÷ (1,602,961,601.0312 × 1,602,961,601.0312) = −0.00000025238 days/cy.

== See also ==
- Lunar calendars
  - Islamic calendar (Lunar Hijri calendar)
  - Javanese calendar
- Lunisolar calendars
  - Chinese calendar
  - Hebrew calendar
  - Babylonian calendar
  - Hindu calendar
  - Tibetan calendar
