= Lunar distance =

Distance from center of Earth to center of Moon

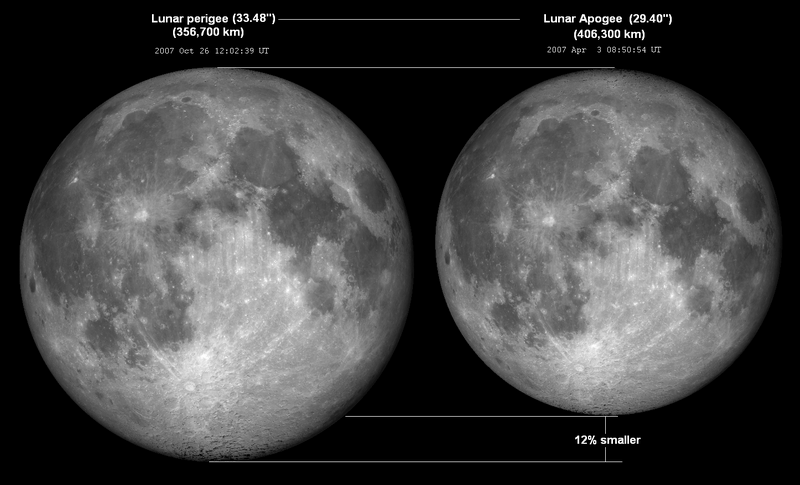
- A lunar distance, 384,399 km (238,854 mi), is the Moon's average distance to Earth. The actual distance varies over the course of its orbit. The image compares the Moon's apparent size when it is nearest and farthest from Earth.

General information
- Unit system: astronomy
- Unit of: distance
- Symbol: LD, $\Delta_{\oplus L}$

Conversions
1 LD in ...	... is equal to ...
- SI base unit: = 3.84399×10^{8} m
- Metric system: = 384399 km
- Imperial units: ≈ 238854.465 miles
- Astronomical unit: ≈ 1/389.1734 (0.002569 au)
- Lightsecond: ≈ 1.282217 ls

The instantaneous Earth–Moon distance, or distance to the Moon, is the distance from the center of Earth to the center of the Moon. In contrast, the Lunar distance (LD or $\Delta_{\oplus L}$), or Earth–Moon characteristic distance, is a unit of measure in astronomy. More technically, it is the semi-major axis of the geocentric lunar orbit. The average lunar distance is approximately 385,000 km (239,000 mi), or 1.3 light-seconds. It is roughly 30 times Earth's diameter; to cover the same distance on earth would take a non-stop airplane flight more than two weeks. Around 389 lunar distances make up an astronomical unit (roughly the distance from Earth to the Sun).

Lunar distance is commonly used to express the distance to near-Earth object encounters. Lunar semi-major axis is an important astronomical datum. It has implications for testing gravitational theories such as general relativity and for refining other astronomical values, such as the mass, radius, and rotation of Earth. The measurement is also useful in measuring the lunar radius, as well as the distance to the Sun.

Millimeter-precision measurements of the lunar distance are made by measuring the time taken for laser light to travel between stations on Earth and retroreflectors placed on the Moon. The precision of the range measurements determines the semi-major axis to a few decimeters. The Moon is spiraling away from Earth at an average rate of 3.8 cm (1.5 in) per year, as detected by the Lunar Laser Ranging experiment.

== Value ==
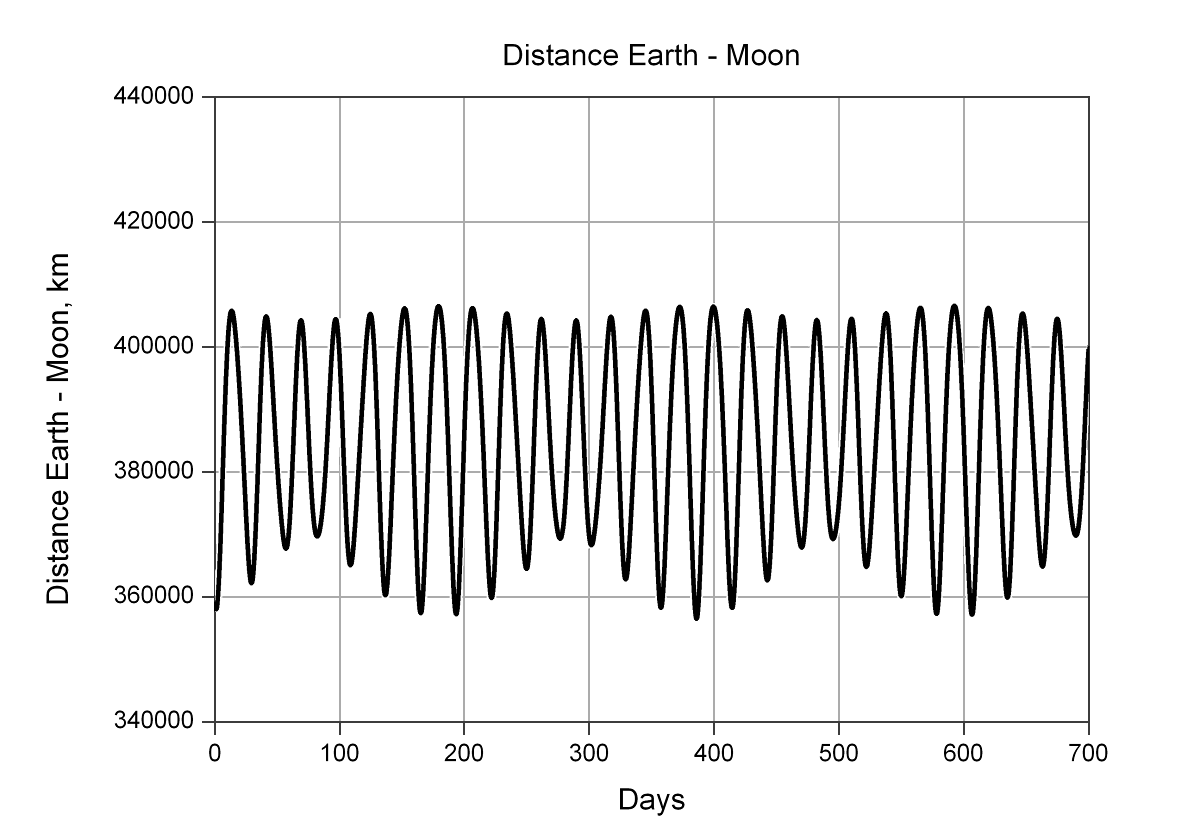
Variation of the distance between the centers of the Moon and the Earth over 700 days

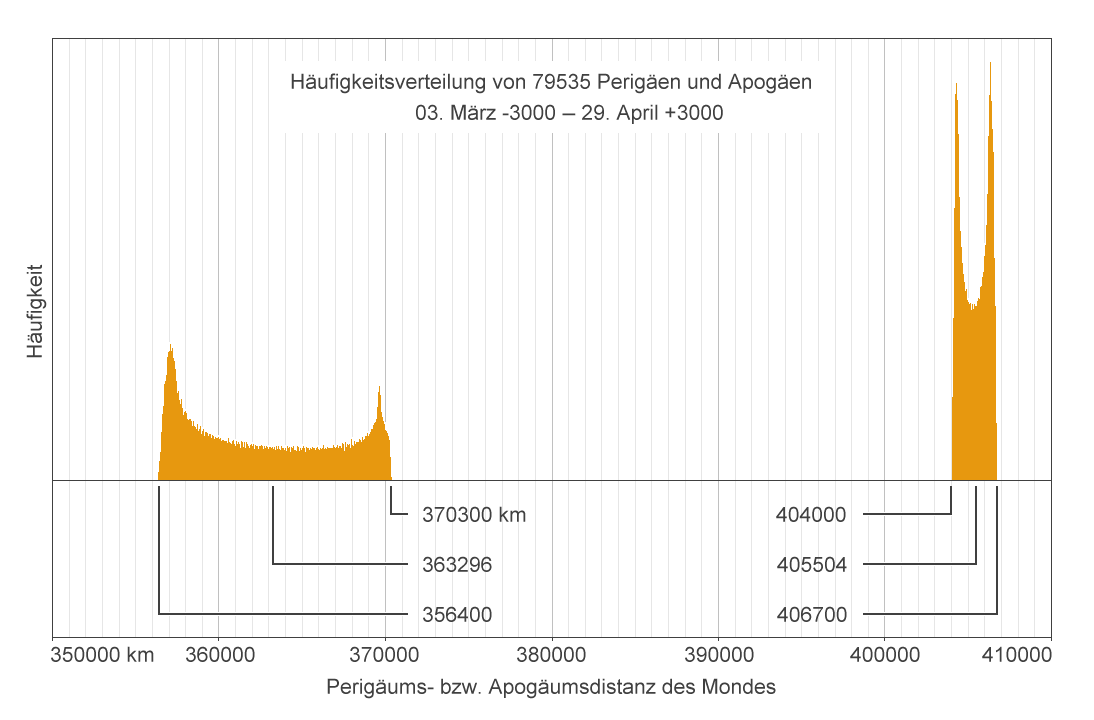
Distribution of perigee and apogee between 3000 BC and AD 3000

Because of the influence of the Sun and other perturbations, the Moon's orbit around the Earth is not a precise ellipse. Nevertheless, different methods have been used to define a semi-major axis. Ernest William Brown provided a formula for the parallax of the Moon as viewed from opposite sides of the Earth, involving trigonometric terms. This is equivalent to a formula for the inverse of the distance, and the average value of this is the inverse of 384,399 km (238,854 mi). On the other hand, the time-averaged distance (rather than the inverse of the average inverse distance) between the centers of Earth and the Moon is 385,000.6 km (239,228.3 mi). One can also model the orbit as an ellipse that is constantly changing, and in this case one can find a formula for the semi-major axis, again involving trigonometric terms. The average value by this method is 383,397 km.

The actual distance varies over the course of the orbit of the Moon. Values at closest approach (perigee) or at farthest (apogee) are rarer the more extreme they are. The graph at right shows the distribution of perigee and apogee over six thousand years.

Jean Meeus gives the following extreme values for 1500 BC to AD 8000:

- greatest distance: 406 719.97 km on January 7, AD 2266
- smallest distance: 356 352.93 km on November 13, 1054 BC

Lunar distance expressed in selected units
Unit	Mean value	Uncertainty
meter	3.84399×10^{8}	1.1 mm
kilometer	384,399	1.1 mm
mile	238,854	0.043 in
Earth radius	60.32	
AU	1/388.6 = 0.00257	
light-second	1.282	37.5×10^{−12}

- An AU is 389 Lunar distances.
- A lightyear is 24,611,700 Lunar distances.
- Geostationary Earth Orbit is 42,164 km (26,199 mi) from Earth center, or 1/9.117 LD = 0.10968 LD (or 0.10968 LDEO)
Scale model of the Earth–Moon system (respecting sizes and distances), utilizing the mean radii of both bodies and mean distance of the orbit. Scroll right to find the Moon.

Distance between the Earth and Moon (mean value) – sizes and distance to scale – with travel time at speed of light animated

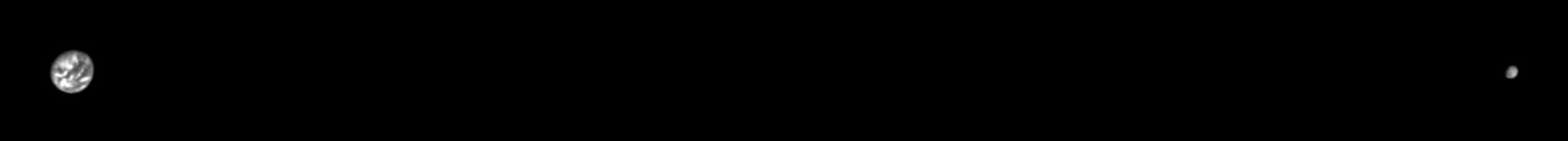
Photo of Earth and Moon, taken by the OSIRIS-REx probe

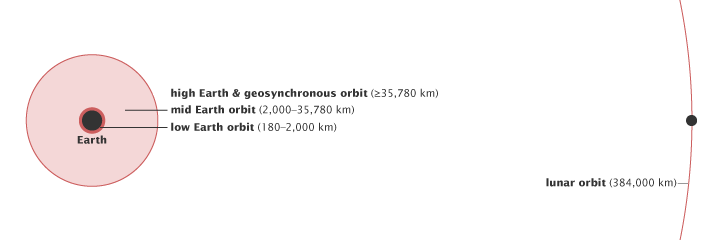
Lunar distance to scale, with Medium Earth orbital (MEO) space as pink area for reference

== Variation ==
Minimum, mean and maximum distances of the Moon from Earth with its angular diameter as seen from Earth's surface, to scale

The instantaneous lunar distance is constantly changing. The actual distance between the Moon and Earth can change as quickly as 75 meters per second, or more than 1,000 km (620 mi) in just 6 hours, due to its non-circular orbit. There are other effects that also influence the lunar distance. Some factors are listed in the sections below.

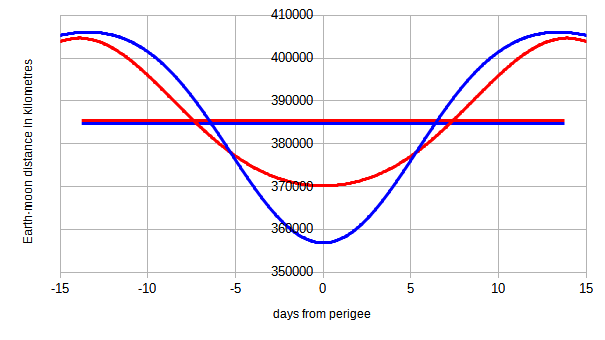
Lunar distance when perigee is at syzygy (full moon or new moon, in blue) or at half moon (red). The horizontal lines (extending exactly half a mean anomalistic month to each side of perigee) are the respective averages over one mean anomalistic month, and are almost identical.

=== Perturbations and eccentricity ===
The distance to the Moon can be measured to an accuracy of 2 mm over a 1-hour sampling period, which results in an overall uncertainty of a decimeter for the semi-major axis. However, due to its elliptical orbit with varying eccentricity, the instantaneous distance varies with monthly periodicity. Furthermore, the distance is perturbed by the gravitational effects of various astronomical bodies – most significantly the Sun and less so Venus and Jupiter. Other forces responsible for minute perturbations are: gravitational attraction to other planets in the Solar System and to asteroids; tidal forces; and relativistic effects. The effect of radiation pressure from the Sun contributes an amount of ±3.6 mm to the lunar distance.

Although the instantaneous uncertainty is a few millimeters, the measured lunar distance can change by more than 30,000 km (19,000 mi) from the mean value throughout a typical month. These perturbations are well understood and the lunar distance can be accurately modeled over thousands of years.

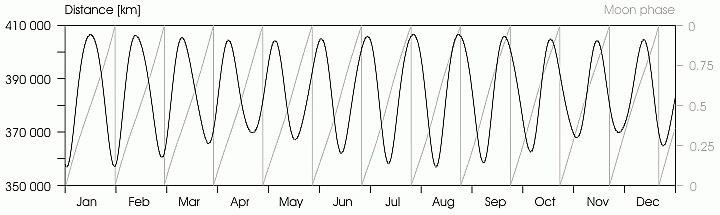
The Moon's distance from the Earth and Moon phases in 2014. Moon phases: 0 (1) – new moon, 0.25 – first quarter, 0.5 – full moon, 0.75 – last quarter.

=== Tidal dissipation ===
Through the action of tidal forces, the angular momentum of Earth's rotation is slowly being transferred to the Moon's orbit. The result is that Earth's rate of spin is gradually decreasing (at a rate of 2.4 milliseconds/century), and the lunar orbit is gradually expanding. The rate of recession is 3.830±0.008 cm per year. However, it is believed that this rate has recently increased, as a rate of 3.8 cm/year would imply that the Moon is only 1.5 billion years old, whereas scientific consensus supports an age of about 4 billion years. It is also believed that this anomalously high rate of recession may continue to accelerate.

Theoretically, the lunar distance will continue to increase until the Earth and Moon become tidally locked, as are Pluto and Charon. This would occur when the duration of the lunar orbital period equals the rotational period of Earth, which is estimated to be 47 Earth days. The two bodies would then be at equilibrium, and no further rotational energy would be exchanged. However, models predict that 50 billion years would be required to achieve this configuration, which is significantly longer than the expected lifetime of the Solar System.

=== Orbital history ===
Laser measurements show that the average lunar distance is increasing, which implies that the Moon was closer in the past, and that Earth's days were shorter. Fossil studies of mollusk shells from the Campanian era (80 million years ago) show that there were 372 days (of just under 23 h 34 min) per year during that time, which implies that the lunar distance was about 60.05 R_{🜨} (383,000 km or 238,000 mi). There is geological evidence that the average lunar distance was about 52 R_{🜨} (332,000 km or 205,000 mi) during the Precambrian Era; 2500 million years BP.

The widely accepted giant impact hypothesis states that the Moon was created as a result of a catastrophic impact between Earth and another planet, resulting in a re-accumulation of fragments at an initial distance of 3.8 R_{🜨} (24,000 km or 15,000 mi). This theory assumes the initial impact to have occurred 4.5 billion years ago.

== History of measurement ==
Until the late 1950s most measurements of lunar distance were based on optical angular measurements: the earliest accurate measurement was by Aristarchus of Samos, and later Hipparchus in the 2nd century BC. The space age marked a turning point when the precision of this value was much improved. During the 1950s and 1960s, there were experiments using radar, lasers, and spacecraft, conducted with the benefit of computer processing and modeling.

Some historically significant or otherwise interesting methods of determining the lunar distance:

=== Eclipses ===
The earliest account of attempts to measure the lunar distance using an eclipse were by Greek astronomer and mathematician Aristarchus in 270 BC. He exploited observations of a lunar eclipse combined with knowledge of Earth's radius and an understanding that the Sun is much further than the Moon. By observing the duration of an eclipse, which is about 4 hours, and comparing that to the orbital period of the moon (28 days), the circumference of the moon's orbit was determined.

Later, in 129 BC, Hipparchus performed a calculation based on observing a solar eclipse from two separate locations. In one location, the eclipse was complete, but in another, the sun was partially visible. Using trigonometry, his calculations produced a result of 62-73 R_{🜨}. This method later found its way into the work of Ptolemy, who produced a result of 64 1/6 R_{🜨} (409000 km or 253000 mi) at its farthest point.

=== Parallax ===
Early methods involved measuring the angle between the Moon and a chosen reference point from multiple locations, simultaneously. The synchronization can be coordinated by making measurements at a pre-determined time, or during an event which is observable to all parties. Before accurate mechanical chronometers, the synchronization event was typically a lunar eclipse, occultation, or the moment when the Moon crossed the meridian (if the observers shared the same longitude). This measurement technique is known as lunar parallax.

For increased accuracy, the measured angle can be adjusted to account for refraction and distortion of light passing through the atmosphere.

=== Meridian crossing ===
An expedition by French astronomer A.C.D. Crommelin observed lunar meridian transits on the same night from two locations. Careful measurements from 1905 to 1910 measured the angle of elevation at the moment when a specific lunar crater (Mösting A) crossed the local meridian, from stations at Greenwich and at Cape of Good Hope. A distance was calculated with an uncertainty of 30 km, and this remained the definitive lunar distance value for the next half century.

=== Occultations ===
By recording the instant when the Moon occults a background star, (or similarly, measuring the angle between the Moon and a background star at a predetermined moment) the lunar distance can be determined, as long as the measurements are taken from multiple locations of known separation.

Astronomers O'Keefe and Anderson calculated the lunar distance by observing four occultations from nine locations in 1952. They calculated a semi-major axis of 384407.6±4.7 km (238,859.8 ± 2.9 mi). This value was refined in 1962 by Irene Fischer, who incorporated updated geodetic data to produce a value of 384403.7±2 km (238,857.4 ± 1 mi).

=== Radar ===
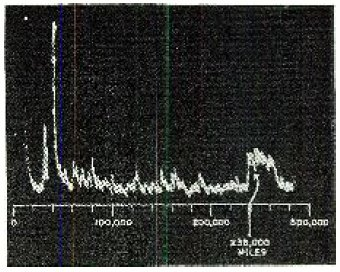
Oscilloscope display showing the radar signal. The large pulse on the left is the transmitted signal, the small pulse on the right is the return signal from the Moon. The horizontal axis is time, but is calibrated in miles. It can be seen that the measured range is 238,000 mi (383,000 km), approximately the distance from the Earth to the Moon.

The distance to the moon was directly measured by means of radar first in 1946 as part of Project Diana.

Later, an experiment was conducted in 1957 at the U.S. Naval Research Laboratory that used the echo from radar signals to determine the Earth-Moon distance. Radar pulses lasting 2 μs were broadcast from a 50-foot (15 m) diameter radio dish. After the radio waves echoed off the surface of the Moon, the return signal was detected and the delay time measured. From that measurement, the distance could be calculated. In practice, however, the signal-to-noise ratio was so low that an accurate measurement could not be reliably produced.

The experiment was repeated in 1958 at the Royal Radar Establishment, in England. Radar pulses lasting 5 μs were transmitted with a peak power of 2 megawatts, at a repetition rate of 260 pulses per second. After the radio waves echoed off the surface of the Moon, the return signal was detected and the delay time measured. Multiple signals were added together to obtain a reliable signal by superimposing oscilloscope traces onto photographic film. From the measurements, the distance was calculated with an uncertainty of 1.25 km (0.777 mi).

These initial experiments were intended to be proof-of-concept experiments and only lasted one day. Follow-on experiments lasting one month produced a semi-major axis of 384402±1.2 km (238,856 ± 0.75 mi), which was the most precise measurement of the lunar distance at the time.

=== Laser ranging ===
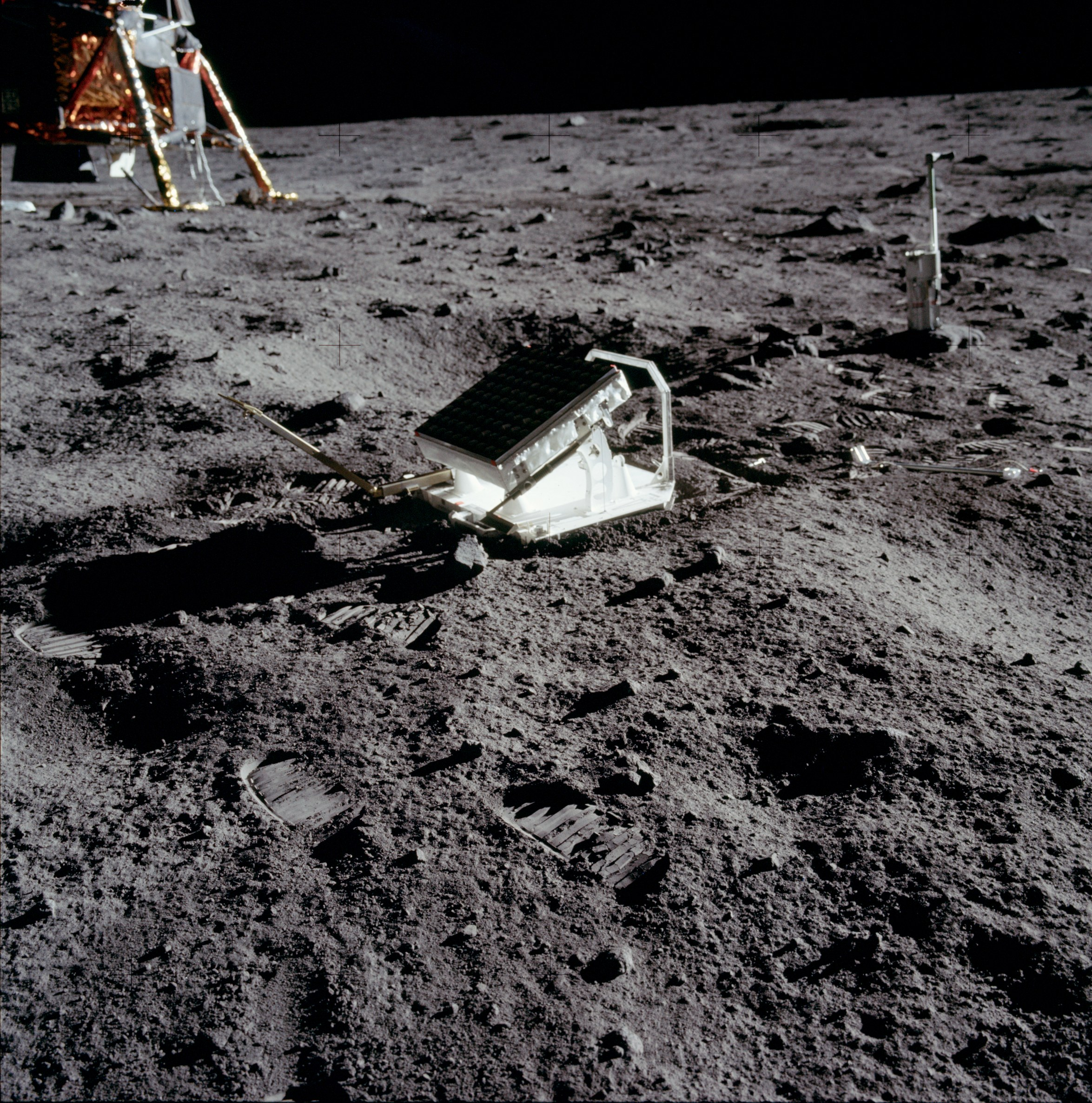
Lunar Laser Ranging Experiment from the Apollo 11 mission

An experiment which measured the round-trip time of flight of laser pulses reflected directly off the surface of the Moon was performed in 1962, by a team from Massachusetts Institute of Technology, and a Soviet team at the Crimean Astrophysical Observatory.

During the Apollo missions in 1969, astronauts placed retroreflectors on the surface of the Moon for the purpose of refining the accuracy and precision of this technique. The measurements are ongoing and involve multiple laser facilities. The instantaneous precision of the Lunar Laser Ranging experiments can achieve small millimeter resolution, and is the most reliable method of determining the lunar distance. The semi-major axis is determined to be 384,399.0 km.

=== Amateur astronomers and citizen scientists ===
Due to the modern accessibility of accurate timing devices, high resolution digital cameras, GPS receivers, powerful computers and near-instantaneous communication, it has become possible for amateur astronomers to make high accuracy measurements of the lunar distance.

On May 23, 2007, digital photographs of the Moon during a near-occultation of Regulus were taken from two locations, in Greece and England. By measuring the parallax between the Moon and the chosen background star, the lunar distance was calculated.

A more ambitious project called the "Aristarchus Campaign" was conducted during the lunar eclipse of 15 April 2014. During this event, participants were invited to record a series of five digital photographs from moonrise until culmination (the point of greatest altitude).

The method took advantage of the fact that the Moon is actually closest to an observer when it is at its highest point in the sky, compared to when it is on the horizon. Although it appears that the Moon is biggest when it is near the horizon, the opposite is true. This phenomenon is known as the Moon illusion. The reason for the difference in distance is that the distance from the center of the Moon to the center of the Earth is nearly constant throughout the night, but an observer on the surface of Earth is actually 1 Earth radius from the center of Earth. This offset brings them closest to the Moon when it is overhead.

Modern cameras have achieved a resolution capable of capturing the Moon with enough precision to detect and measure this tiny variation in apparent size. The results of this experiment were calculated as LD = 60.51+3.91
−4.19 R_{🜨}. The accepted value for that night was 60.61 R_{🜨}, which implied a 3% accuracy. The benefit of this method is that the only measuring equipment needed is a modern digital camera (equipped with an accurate clock, and a GPS receiver).

Other experimental methods of measuring the lunar distance that can be performed by amateur astronomers involve:

- Taking pictures of the Moon before it enters the penumbra and after it is completely eclipsed.
- Measuring, as precisely as possible, the time of the eclipse contacts.
- Taking good pictures of the partial eclipse when the shape and size of the Earth shadow are clearly visible.
- Taking a picture of the Moon including, in the same field of view, Spica and Mars – from various locations.

== Calculations ==
The collection of tables that describe the moon's position is called lunar ephemeris. Modern methods compute the ephemeris using equations which accommodate for the known perturbation effects. These include gravitational forces of the Earth, Sun, and other planets, and also minor variation due to tidal forces, relativistic effects, and changes within the solar system.

The formula for ephemeris ELP2000, by Chapront and Touzé for the distance in kilometers begins with the terms:

$$\begin{alignat}{3}
\frac{d}{\mathrm{km}} = 385000.5584 & \ -\ 20905.3550  \cdot \cos(G_M)     \\
& \ -   \  3699.1109  \cdot \cos(2D - G_M)      \\
& \ -   \  2955.9676  \cdot \cos(2D)            \\
& \ -   \ 569.9251    \cdot \cos(2G_M)          \\
& \ \pm \ \dotsc
\end{alignat}$$

Where $G_M$ is the mean anomaly (more or less how moon has moved from perigee) and $D$ is the mean elongation (more or less how far it has moved from conjunction with the Sun at new moon). They can be calculated from

G_{M} = 134.963 411 38° + 13.064 992 953 630°/d · t

D = 297.850 204 20° + 12.190 749 117 502°/d · t

where t is the time (in days) since January 1, 2000 (see Epoch (astronomy)). This shows that the smallest perigee occurs at either new moon or full moon (ca 356870 km), as does the greatest apogee (ca 406079 km), whereas the greatest perigee will be around half-moon (ca 370180 km), as will be the smallest apogee (ca 404593 km). The exact values will be slightly different due to other terms. Twice in every full moon cycle of about 411 days there will be a minimal perigee and a maximal apogee, separated by two weeks, and a maximal perigee and a minimal apogee, also separated by two weeks.

== See also ==
- Astronomical unit
- Ephemeris
- Jet Propulsion Laboratory Development Ephemeris
- Lunar Laser Ranging experiment
- Lunar theory
- On the Sizes and Distances (Aristarchus)
- Orbit of the Moon
- Prutenic Tables of Erasmus Reinhold
- Supermoon
