= Lunar standstill =

Moon stops moving north or south

Lunar nodal precession and the Moon's declination

A lunar standstill or lunistice (reminiscent of solstice) is the relative position of the Moon furthest north or furthest south from the celestial equator (measured as an angle expressed in degrees called declination of a celestial coordinate system, analogous to latitude). The Moon comes to an apparent so-called standstill as it changes at that point direction of moving between northern and southern positions in the course of a month (specifically a tropical month of about 27.3 days). The degree of lunar standstills changes over the course of 18.6 years, between positions of about 18.134° (north or south) and 28.725° (north or south), due to lunar precession. These extremes are called the minor and major lunar standstills.

The last minor lunar standstill was in October 2015, and the next one will be in 2034. The previous major lunar standstill was in 2006 and the most recent in December 2024.

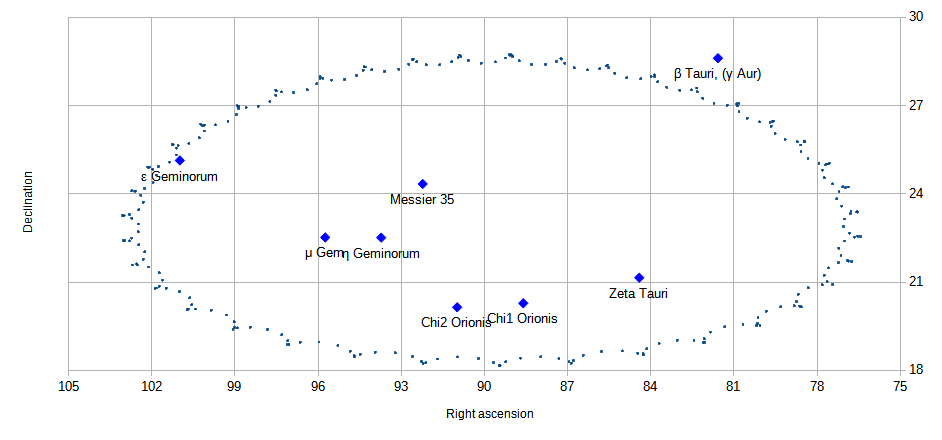
Location of the northern lunistices from 2006 to 2025

At this time the northern lunistice occurs when the Moon is seen in the direction of Taurus, northern Orion, Gemini, or sometimes the southernmost part of Auriga (as at the time of a major lunistice). The southern lunistice occurs when the Moon is in Sagittarius or Ophiuchus. Due to precession of the Earth's axis, the northernmost and southernmost locations of the Moon in the sky move westward, and in about 13,000 years the northern lunistice will occur in Sagittarius and Ophiuchus and the southern lunistice in the area of Gemini.

During a minor lunar standstill, tidal forces are slightly increased in some places, leading to increased amplitude of tides and tidal flooding.

At a major lunar standstill, the Moon's range of declination, and consequently its range of azimuth at moonrise and moonset, reaches a maximum. As a result, viewed from the middle latitudes, the Moon's altitude at upper culmination (the daily moment when the object appears to contact the observer's meridian) changes in two weeks from its maximum possible value to its minimum possible value above the horizon, due north or due south (depending on the observer's hemisphere). Similarly, its azimuth at moonrise changes from northeast to southeast and at moonset from northwest to southwest.

The times of lunar standstills appear to have had special significance for the Bronze Age societies who built the megalithic monuments in Britain and Ireland. It also has significance for some neopagan religions. Evidence also exists that alignments to the moonrise or moonset on the days of lunar standstills can be found in ancient sites of other ancient cultures, such as at Chaco Canyon in New Mexico, Chimney Rock in Colorado and Hopewell Sites in Ohio.

== Timing ==
A major lunar standstill occurs when the Moon's declination reaches a maximum monthly limit, at around 28.72° north or south, whereas a minor lunar standstill occurs when the declination reaches a minimum monthly limit, at around 18.13° north or south. The exact values depend on the exact positions of the Sun, the Moon, the lunar nodes, and the perigee.

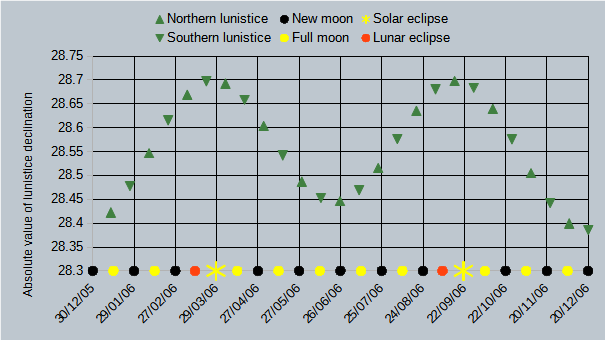
Absolute value of declination for lunistices in 2006. At the bottom are shown the times of new moon, full moon, and eclipses. The highest values are near the equinoxes and near eclipses.

Lunistices occur near in time to equinoxes and eclipses. This is because the Moon's orbital inclination has periodic terms, and the main periodic term increases the inclination by 0.135° whenever the Sun lines up with the nodes of the Moon's orbit, in other words at the middle of an eclipse season. Since lunistices occur around the time when the nodes are lined up with the celestial equinox, and since the Sun is near a node, this means they occur around the time when the Sun is at a celestial equinox, that is, around the vernal or autumnal equinox.

The dates at which the nodes line up with the celestial equinoxes are not the same as the dates when the Moon actually gets to the lunistice position, and can occur at any time of the year. This is both because of the fluctuation in inclination mentioned above, and because the Moon has to arrive at right ascension 6 hours or 18 hours (90° or 270°). The lining up occurs once every 6798.38 days on average (18.613 Julian years of 365.25 days, or 18 years and 223 or 224 days), although the node undergoes a fluctuation of amplitude 1.5°, which can delay or advance the lining up by up to about a month. Between 1901 and 2100, these dates are in 1913, 1932, 1950, 1969, 1987, 2006, 2025, 2043, 2062, 2080 and 2099 for major lunistice and 1904, 1922, 1941, 1959, 1978, 1997, 2015, 2034, 2052, 2071 and 2090 for minor lunistice.

== Name ==
The different terms lunar standstill and lunistice have been used interchangeable, but have been differentiated by calling a lunistice as the extreme specifically of the 18.6 year cycle, and a lunar standstill as an extreme of any cycle.

The term lunar standstill was apparently first used by engineer Alexander Thom in his 1971 book Megalithic Lunar Observatories. The term lunistice is from the Latin luna- (moon) + -stitium (a stoppage), and describes the extremes in the Moon's varying declination.

At a lunistice, or a lunar standstill, the Moon does not actually stand still; what happens is merely that, as viewed from the Earth, the variation in the declination of the Moon changes direction.

== Origin of knowledge ==
The lunar standstill phenomenon was probably known from Megalithic times. In high latitudes, there is a period within the 18.6 years cycle, when the Moon becomes circumpolar, which would have drawn the attention of locals. In other latitudes, the major lunar standstill featured constant scene illumination during the full Moon. When the Sun was setting, the Moon was already high enough in the sky.

== Informal explanation ==

As Earth rotates on its axis, the stars in the night sky appear to follow circular paths around the celestial poles. (This daily cycle of apparent movement is called diurnal motion.) All the stars seem fixed on a celestial sphere surrounding the observer. In the same way that positions on Earth are measured using latitude and longitude, the apparent places of stars on this sphere are measured in right ascension (corresponding to longitude) and declination (corresponding to latitude). If viewed from a latitude of 50° N on Earth, any star with a declination of +50° would pass directly overhead (reaching the zenith at upper culmination) once every sidereal day (23 hours, 56 minutes, 4 seconds), whether visible at night or obscured in daylight.

Unlike the stars, the Sun and Moon do not have a fixed declination. Since Earth's rotational axis is tilted by about 23.5° with respect to a line perpendicular to its orbital plane (the ecliptic), the Sun's declination ranges from +23.5° at the June solstice to −23.5° at the December solstice, as the Earth orbits the Sun once every tropical year. Therefore, in June, in the Northern Hemisphere, the midday Sun is higher in the sky, and daytime then is longer than in December. In the Southern Hemisphere, the situation is reversed. This obliquity causes Earth's seasons.

The Moon's declination also changes, completing a cycle once every tropical month of 27.3 days. Thus, lunar declination ranges from a positive value to a negative one in just under two weeks, and back. Consequently, in under a month, the Moon's altitude at upper culmination (when it contacts the observer's meridian) can shift from higher in the sky to lower above the horizon, and back.

Thus the Moon's declination varies cyclically with a period of about four weeks, but the amplitude of this oscillation varies over an 18.6-year cycle. A lunar standstill occurs at the points in this latter cycle when this amplitude reaches a minimum or a maximum.

The Moon differs from most natural satellites around other planets in that it remains near the ecliptic (the plane of Earth's orbit around the Sun) instead of Earth's equatorial plane. The Moon's maximum and minimum declination vary because the plane of the Moon's orbit around Earth is inclined by about 5.14° with respect to the ecliptic plane, and the spatial direction of the Moon's orbital inclination gradually changes over an 18.6-year cycle, alternately adding to or subtracting from the 23.5° tilt of Earth's axis.

Therefore, the maximum declination of the Moon varies roughly from 18.3° (5.14° less than the Earth's axial tilt) to 28.6° (5.14° more). At the minor lunar standstill, the Moon will change its declination during the tropical month from +18.3° to −18.3°, for a total range of 37°. Then 9.3 years later, during the major lunar standstill, the Moon will change its declination during the month roughly from +28.6° to −28.6°, which totals 57° in range. This range is enough to bring the Moon's altitude at culmination from high in the sky to low above the horizon in just two weeks (half an orbit).

Strictly speaking, the lunar standstill is a moving position in the sky relative to the direction of Earth's axis and to the rotation of the Moon's orbital nodes (lunar nodal precession) once every 18.6 years. The standstill position does not persist over the two weeks that the Moon takes to move from its maximum (positive) declination to its minimum (negative) declination, and it most likely will not exactly coincide with either extreme. However, because the 18.6-year cycle of standstills is so much longer than the Moon's orbital period (about 27.3 days), the change in the declination range over periods as short as half an orbit is very small. The period of the lunar nodes precessing in space is slightly shorter than the lunar standstill interval due to Earth's axial precession, altering Earth's axial tilt over a very long period relative to the direction of lunar nodal precession. Put simply, the standstill cycle results from the combination of the two inclinations.

As stated earlier, lunistices occur near in time to eclipses. In a year of a major lunar standstill, solar eclipses occur in March or April at ascending node and in September or October at descending node, whereas lunar eclipses at descending node occur in March or April and lunar eclipses at ascending node occur in September or October. In a year of a minor lunar standstill the situation is reversed. For a major lunistice, an eclipse season near the March equinox has solar and lunar eclipses of odd-numbered saros, while another eclipse season near the September equinox has solar and lunar eclipses of even-numbered saros. For a minor lunistice, the eclipse season near the March equinox has solar and lunar eclipses of even-numbered saros, while the eclipse season near the September equinox has solar and lunar eclipses at an odd-numbered saros.

== Apparent position of the Moon during standstill ==
The azimuth (horizontal direction) of moonrise and moonset varies according to the Moon's tropical month of 27.322 days, while the azimuth variation during each tropical month varies with the lunar standstill period (18.613 years).

Due to the effect mentioned above, the time (at latitudes not too close to the equator) when the Moon is at its absolutely greatest angle above the horizon (its "altitude angle") over the course of the 18.6-year cycle occurs about a week after new moon if it's in the spring, or a week before new moon if it's in the autumn. This means that it will be a half moon, and will be at this highest point at sundown (in the spring) or sunrise (in the autumn). In the winter, three months away from that time, the Moon will be almost as high (about half a Moon diameter less) as a full Moon at midnight. Also at other times during the 18.6-year cycle the full moon will be highest at midnight in midwinter, near the time of the lunistice of the tropical month.

For a latitude of 55° north or 55° south on Earth, the following table shows moonrise and moonset azimuths for the Moon's narrowest and widest arc paths across the sky. The azimuths are given in degrees from true north and apply when the horizon is unobstructed. Figures for a time midway between major and minor standstill are also given.

The arc path of the full Moon generally reaches its widest in midwinter and its narrowest in midsummer, and vice versa for the arc path of the new Moon. The arc path of the first quarter Moon generally reaches its widest in midspring and its narrowest in midautumn, and vice versa for the arc path of the last quarter Moon.

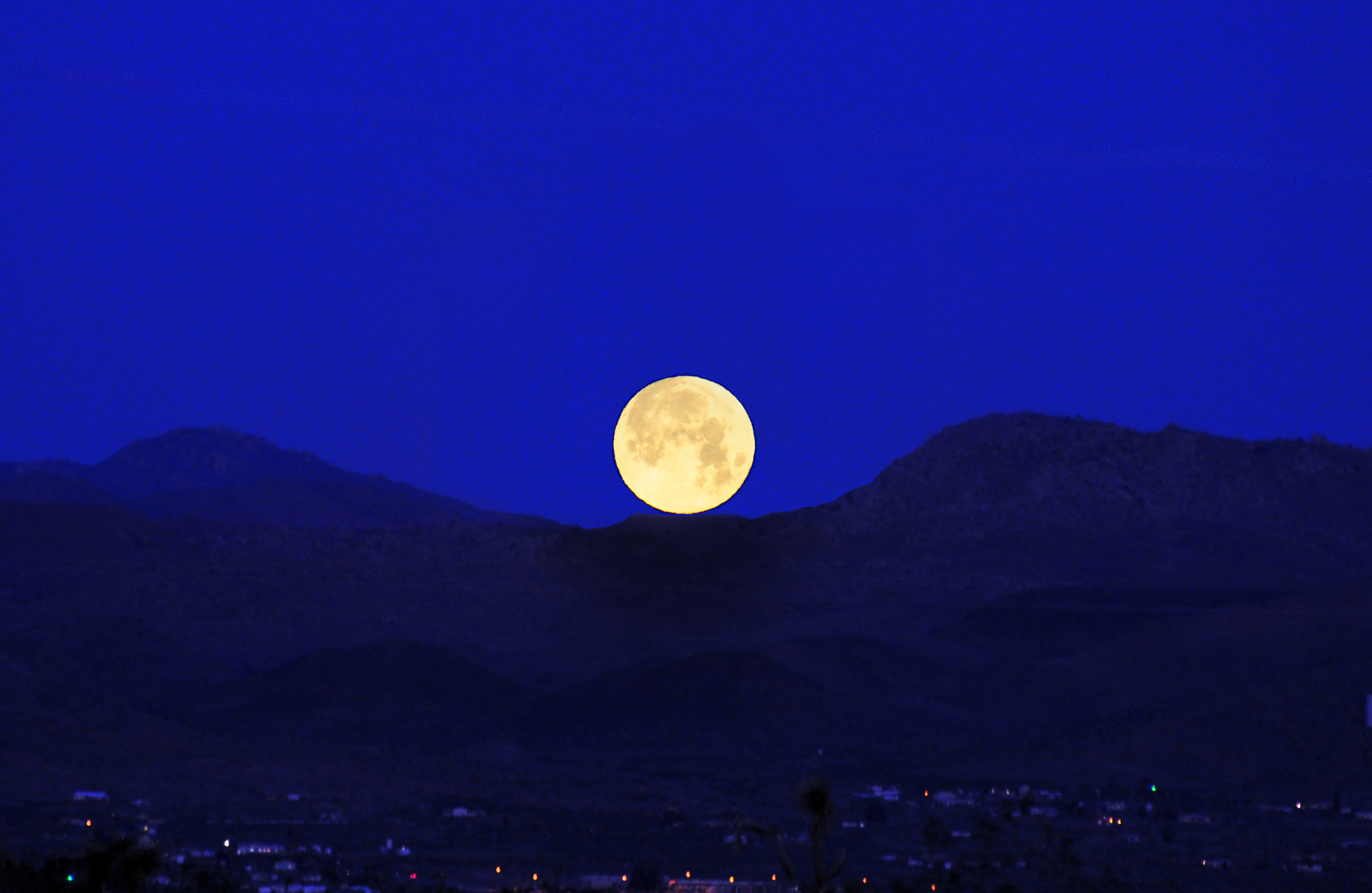
An early-morning moonset in the Mojave Desert, California (February 2016)

Azimuth of full Moon on horizon (as viewed from 55° south)
	Widest arc		Narrowest arc	
Epoch	Moonrise	Moonset	Moonrise	Moonset
Minor standstill	124°	236°	56°	304°
Midway	135°	225°	45°	315°
Major standstill	148°	212°	32°	328°

For observers at the middle latitudes (not too near the Equator or either pole), the Moon is highest in the sky in each period of 24 hours when it reaches the observer's meridian. During the month, these culmination altitudes vary so as to produce a greatest value and a least value. The following table shows these altitudes at different times in the lunar nodal period for an observer at 55° north or 55° south. The greatest and least culminations occur about two weeks apart.

Altitude at culmination (as viewed from 55° north or south)
Epoch	Greatest	Least
Minor standstill	53.5°	16.5°
Midway	58.5°	11.5°
Major standstill	63.5°	6.5°

The following table shows some approximate dates for when the Moon's node passed, or will pass, the equinox. The Moon's greatest declination occurs within a few months of these times, closer to an equinox, depending on its detailed orbit. The dates are calculated from the path of the mean node, without the small periodic fluctuations which can move the date by a few weeks.

Times of lunar standstill
Major standstill	Minor standstill
August 1950	December 1959
March 1969	July 1978
November 1987	February 1997
June 2006	October 2015
January 2025	May 2034
September 2043	December 2052

North of latitude 62°, such as in Fairbanks, Alaska, a half Moon can be seen straight north at major lunistice. This will be at dawn if the Moon is waxing, or at sundown if the Moon is waning.

== Effects on Earth ==
During a minor lunar standstill, the tidal forces (gravitational forces) of solar objects are more aligned. This leads to an increased amplitude in tides and tidal flooding at the 18.6-year interval. Equatorial Pacific sea-surface temperature and South Pacific atmospheric pressure correlate with the declination that the Moon reaches in the tropical month and may have an effect on the El Niño-La Niña oscillation.

== Detailed explanation ==
Apparent paths of the Sun and Moon on the celestial sphere (angles exaggerated for clarity)

A more detailed explanation is best considered in terms of the paths of the Sun and Moon on the celestial sphere, as shown in the first diagram. This shows the abstract sphere surrounding the Earth at the center. The Earth is oriented so that its axis is vertical.

The Sun is, by definition, always seen on the ecliptic (the Sun's apparent path across the sky) while Earth is tilted at an angle of e = 23.5° to the plane of that path and completes one orbit around the Sun in 365.25636 days, slightly longer than one year due to precession altering the direction of Earth's inclination.

The Moon's orbit around Earth (shown dotted) is inclined at an angle of i = 5.14° relative to the ecliptic. The Moon completes one orbit around the Earth in 27.32166 days. The two points at which the Moon crosses the ecliptic are known as its orbital nodes, shown as "N1" and "N2" (ascending node and descending node, respectively), and the line connecting them is known as the line of nodes. Due to precession of the Moon's orbital plane, these crossing points, and the positions of eclipses, gradually shift around the ecliptic in a period of 18.6 years.

Looking at the diagram, note that when the Moon's line of nodes (N1 & N2) rotates a little more than shown, and aligns with Earth's equator, the Moon's orbit will reach its steepest angle with the Earth's equator, and 9.3 years later it will be the shallowest: the 5.14° declination (tilt) of the Moon's orbit either adds to (major standstill) or subtracts from (minor standstill) the inclination of Earth's rotation axis (23.439°).

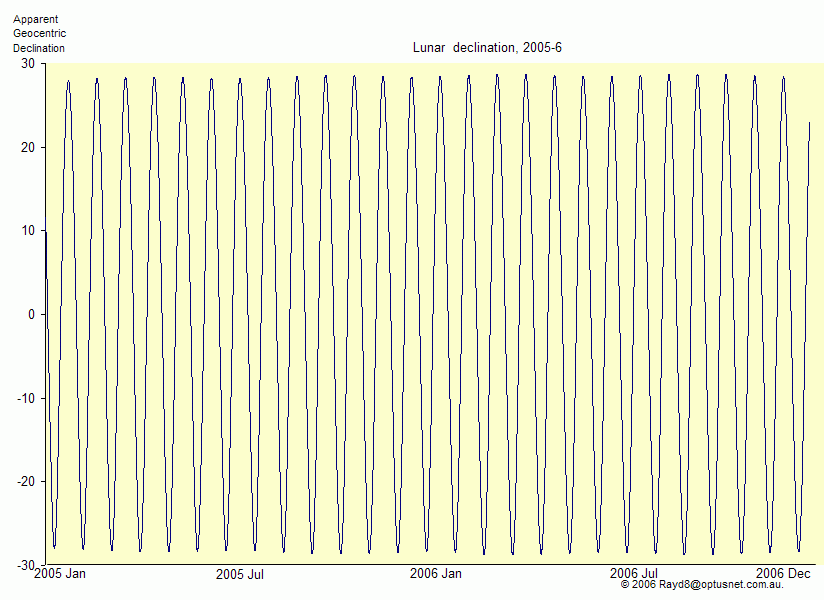
The declination of the Moon in 2005–06

The effect of this on the declination of the Moon is shown in the second diagram. During the course of the nodal period, as the Moon orbits the Earth, its declination swings from –m° to +m°, where m is a number in the range (e – i) ≤ m ≤ (e + i). At a minor standstill (e.g., in 2015), its declination during the month varies from –(e – i) ≈ –18.5° to +(e – i) ≈ 18.3°. During a major standstill (e.g., in 2005–2006), the declination of the Moon varied during each month from about –(e + i) ≈ –28.6° to +(e + i) ≈ 28.5°.

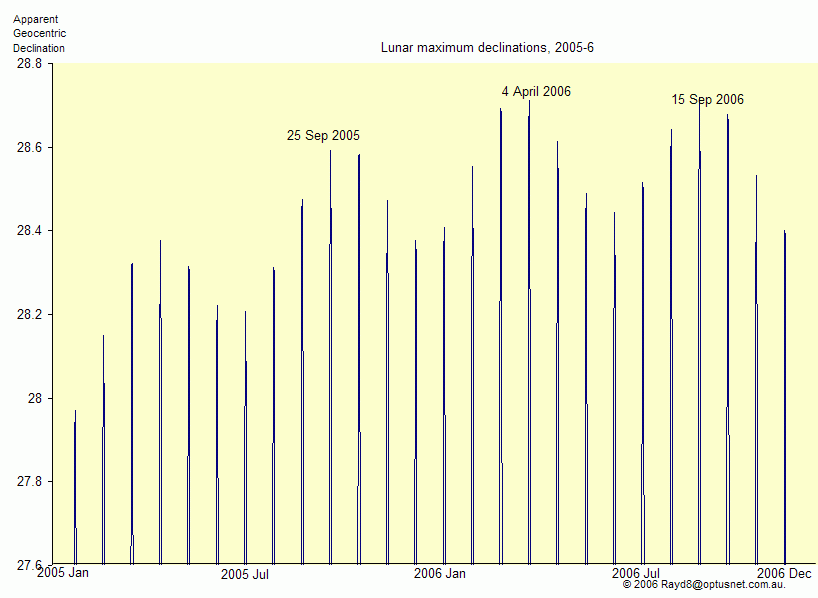
The maximum declinations of the Moon in 2005–06

However, an additional subtlety further complicates the picture. The Sun's gravitational attraction on the Moon pulls it toward the plane of the ecliptic, causing a slight wobble of about 9 arcmin within a 173-day period. In 2006, the effect of this was that, although the lining up of the nodes with the celestial equinoxes occurred in June, the maximum declination of the Moon was not in June but in September, as shown in the third diagram. The maximum absolute value of declination was in the preceding March, at −28.7215°.

== Other complications ==
The observed maximum of each standstill cycle varies according to one's position on Earth when observing. Because the Moon is relatively close to the Earth, lunar parallax alters declination (up to 0.95°) when observed from Earth's surface versus geocentric declination, the declination of the Moon from the center of the Earth. Thus geocentric declination may be up to about 0.95° different from the observed declination. The amount of this parallax varies with latitude.

Atmospheric refraction – the bending of the light from the Moon as it passes through the Earth's atmosphere – alters the observed declination of the Moon, more so at low elevation, where the atmosphere is thicker (deeper).

Not all the maxima are observable from all places in the world – the Moon may be below the horizon at a particular observing site during the maximum, and by the time it rises, it may have a lower declination than an observable maximum at some other date.

== 2006 standstill ==
Events in Sydney, Australia	Date/time	RA	Dec	Az.	Elev	Lunar phase
Closest viewing of maximum northern declination, in morning twilight of 15 September (14th in Greenwich)	Thursday, 14 Sept. 19:53 UTC (5:53 AEST)	04:42:57.32	+29:29:22.9	3°	27°	46% waning
Highest visible northern declination, during civil twilight	Tuesday, 4 April 07:49 (17:49 AEST)	06:03:11.66	+29:30:34.5	350°	26°	38% waxing
Highest visible northern declination during darkness	Tuesday, 4 April 09:10 (19:10 AEST)	06:05:22.02	+29:27:29.4	332°	21°	39% waxing
Highest visible southern declination, during civil twilight	Wednesday, 22 March 19:45 (5:45 AEST)	18:10:57.40	−28:37:33.2	41°	83°	50% waning
Highest visible southern declination during darkness	Wednesday, 22 March 18:36 (4:36 AEST)	18:09:01.55	−28:36:29.7	80°	71°	50% waning
Events in London, England	Date/time	RA	Dec	Az.	Elev	Lunar phase
Highest visible maximum, during civil twilight	Friday, 15 September 05:30	06:07:12.72	+28:19:52.6	150°	64°	42% waning
Highest visible maximum during darkness	Tuesday, 7 March 19:43	05:52:33.05	+28:18:26.9	207°	64°	60% waxing
Lowest visible minimum, during civil twilight	Friday, 29 September 17:44	17:49:08.71	−29:31:34.4	186°	9°	43% waxing
Lowest visible minimum during darkness	Saturday, 2 September 20:50	18:15:08.74	−29:25:44.0	198°	7°	70% waxing

Note that the dates and times in this section, and in the table, are in Universal Coordinated Time, all celestial positions are in topocentric apparent coordinates, including the effects of parallax and refraction, and the lunar phase is shown as the fraction of the Moon's disc which is illuminated.

In 2006, the minimum lunar declination, as seen from the centre of the Earth, was at 16:54 UTC on 22 March, when the Moon reached an apparent declination of −28:43:23.3. The next two best contenders were 20:33 on 29 September, at a declination of −28:42:38.3 and 13:12 on 2 September at declination −28:42:16.0.

The maximum lunar declination, as seen from the centre of the Earth, was at 01:26 on 15 September, when the declination reached +28:43:21.6. The next highest was at 07:36 on 4 April, when it reached +28:42:53.9

However, these dates and times do not represent the maxima and minima for observers on the Earth's surface.

For example, after taking refraction and parallax into account, the observed maximum on 15 September in Sydney, Australia, was several hours earlier, and then occurred in daylight. The table shows the major standstills that were actually visible (i.e. not in full daylight, and with the Moon above the horizon) from both London, UK, and Sydney, Australia.

For other places on the Earth's surface, positions of the Moon can be calculated using the JPL ephemeris calculator.
