= Orbit of the Moon =

The Moon's circuit around Earth

- Diagram of the Moon's orbit with respect to the Earth. Angles are correct and relative sizes are to scale, but distances are not to scale.
- Semi-major axis (Note: The geometric mean distance in the orbit (of ELP) which is the semimajor axis of the Moon's elliptical orbit via Kepler's laws.): 384,748 km (239,071 miles)
- Mean distance (Note: The constant in the ELP expressions for the distance, which is the mean distance averaged over time.): 385,000 km (239,000 miles)
- Inverse sine parallax (Note: The inverse sine parallax ɑ/(sin π) is traditionally the Moon's mean distance from Earth (center to center), where ɑ is Earth's equatorial radius, and π is the Moon's parallax between the ends of ɑ. Three of the IAU 1976 Astronomical Constants were "mean distance of Moon from Earth" 384400 km, "equatorial horizontal parallax at mean distance" 3422.608″, and "equatorial radius for Earth" 6378.14 km.): 384,400 km (238,900 miles)
- Perigee: 363,300 km (225,700 miles), avg. (356400–370400 km)
- Apogee: 405,507 km (251,970 miles), avg. (404000–406700 km)
- Mean eccentricity: 0.0549006 (0.026–0.077)
- Mean obliquity: 6.687°

Mean inclination
- of orbit to ecliptic: 5.15° (4.99–5.30)
- of lunar equator to ecliptic: 1.543°

Period of
- orbit around Earth (sidereal): 27.322 days
- orbit around Earth (synodic): 29.530 days
- precession of nodes: 18.5996 years
- precession of line of apsides: 8.8504 years

The orbit of the Moon is, while stable and known, highly complex, and as such still studied by lunar theory. Most models describe the Moon's orbit geocentrically since the Moon is mainly bound to Earth, but it also orbits together with Earth, as the Earth–Moon system, around their shared barycenter. Furthermore from a heliocentric view its geocentric orbit is the result of Earth perturbing the Moon's orbit around the Sun. It orbits Earth in the prograde direction and completes one revolution relative to the Vernal Equinox and the fixed stars in about 27.3 days (a tropical month and a sidereal month), and one revolution relative to the Sun in about 29.5 days (a synodic month).

On average, the distance to the Moon is about 384,400 km (238,900 mi) from Earth's centre, which corresponds to about 60 Earth radii or 1.28 light-seconds. The barycentre lies about 4,670 km (2,900 miles) from Earth's centre (about 73% of its radius). With a mean orbital speed around the barycentre of 1.022 km/s (2,290 mph), the Moon covers a distance of approximately its diameter, or about half a degree on the celestial sphere, each hour.

The Moon differs from most regular satellites of other planets in that its orbital plane is closer to that of its primary – the ecliptic, the plane of Earth's orbit – than to the primary's equatorial plane. The Moon's orbital plane is inclined about 5.1° from the ecliptic (while Earth is tilted about 23.4°).

== Orbital system ==
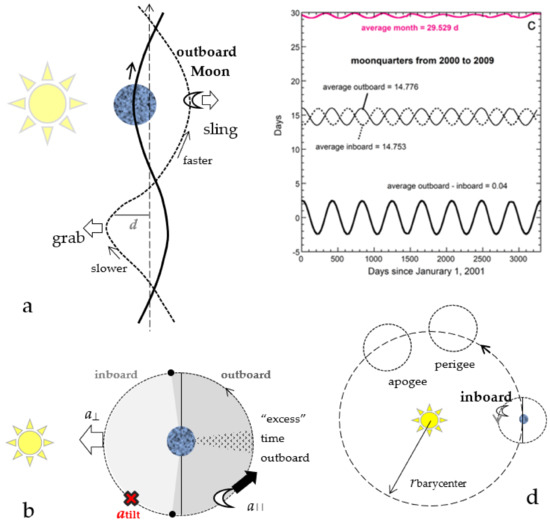
Orbital dynamics of the Moon, with exaggerated paths and sizes, particularly illustrating that the Moon's orbit is on average slightly more outbound than inbound around the Sun, perturbed by Earth.

The orbit of the Moon is complex and dependent on many factors, its gravitational interactions with the Earth and Sun being chief among these. It is considered to be the oldest three-body problem of astronomy. More complex descriptions of its orbit account for the influences of Jupiter or any number (n) of bodies, such as the planets.

The strongest gravitational pull on the Moon is towards the Sun, more than twice that towards Earth. Nevertheless, the Moon remains within Earth's sphere of influence, producing stronger tidal forces (gravitational potential differences) on it than the Sun.

A schematic (not to scale) of Hill spheres (as 2D radii) and Roche limits of each body of the Sun-Earth-Moon system. The actual Hill radius for the Moon is on the order of 60,000 km (i.e., extending less than one-sixth the distance of the 378,000 km between the Moon and the Earth).

The velocity relative to the Sun of a moon is always on average equal to their primary's velocity. But in order to differentiate to trojans and quasi-satellites, true moons need to also remain and not just temporarily stay within the sphere of influence, meaning to equalize oscillating acceleration away and to the primary. The Moon is as such on average matching Earth's heliocentric velocity of 30 km/s and oscillates on average equally in being pulled and dragged by the gravitational attraction with Earth. The orbit of the moon does not offset the shared heliocentric velocity with the primary, transferring velocity, by adding and subtracting velocity unevenly during oscillation. So it not only stays within the sphere of influence, oscillating in it for the time being, but also stays in it, oscillating stably.

Additionally and in contrast to Io the moon of Jupiter, the velocity of the Moon around Earth of 1 km/s is not greater than their heliocentric velocity, making the Moon not go in its heliocentric orbit backwards and forwards in loops, but instead keeps bending toward the Sun, never outward. In representations of the Solar System, it is common to draw the trajectory of Earth from the point of view of the Sun, and at the same time the trajectory of the Moon from the point of view of Earth. This could give the impression that the Moon orbits Earth in such a way that sometimes it goes backwards when viewed from the Sun's perspective. However, because the orbital velocity of the Moon around Earth (1 km/s) is small compared to the orbital velocity of Earth about the Sun (30 km/s), this never happens. There are no rearward loops in the Moon's solar orbit.

Consequently, the Moon's trajectory is always convex (as seen when looking Sunward at the entire Sun–Earth–Moon system from a great distance outside Earth–Moon solar orbit), and is nowhere concave (from the same perspective) or looped. That is, the region enclosed by the Moon's orbit of the Sun is a convex set.

The Moon's and Earth's orbital paths in a heliocentric view can cross, making in a geocentric view the orbit going around Earth possible, while at the same time stay curved towards the Sun, because the interchanging of the bending of the orbits by each other's attraction is enough to make the paths cross, but too few to either bend away from the Sun.

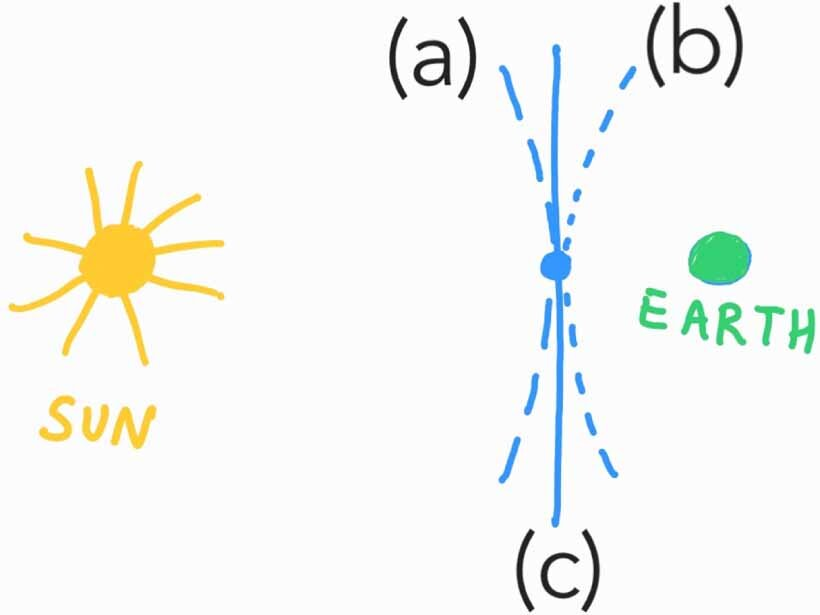
The local curvature of the Moon’s trajectory (a), since being pulled towards the Sun, and not (b) away from the Sun by Earth, or (c) equal to zero, occurring when the gravitational pulls of the Sun and Earth are the same magnitude.

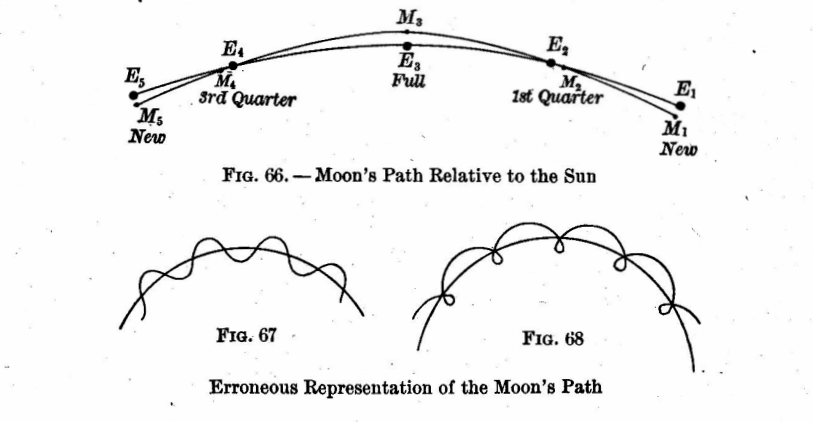
Correct (top) and erroneous (bottom) approximations of the orbit of the Moon in a heliocentric frame of reference (Young 1902 Manual of Astronomy)

Top: A section of Earth's and Moon's trajectories around the Sun over 13 days (streaks: direction of the Sun), with Earth and Moon not to scale.
Bottom: The barycentre is marked on a distance and size scale.

=== Orbital centre ===
The Moon and Earth together have a centre of mass, an orbital barycentre, which remains located within Earth at about 4,700 km (2,900 mi) from Earth's centre, which is roughly 3/4 of Earth's radius. This barycentre slightly moves as the distance between the Moon and Earth changes over the course of their orbits, and over long periods of time the barycentre moves and eventually will exit the Earth, because of the Moon slowly orbiting further away from Earth, as tidal friction drains energy from the rotating pair. The centre of gravity of the Earth–Moon system is about 4,671 km (2,902 miles) or 73.3% of the Earth's radius from the centre of the Earth. This centre of gravity remains on the line between the centres of the Earth and Moon as the Earth completes its diurnal rotation. The path of the Earth–Moon system in its solar orbit is defined as the movement of this mutual centre of gravity around the Sun. Consequently, Earth's centre veers inside and outside the solar orbital path during each synodic month as the Moon moves in its orbit around the common centre of gravity.

The Sun pulls gravitationally stronger on the Moon than Earth does, making the Moon primarily orbit the Sun, not the Earth; this in turn makes, in a heliocentric frame of reference, the Moon's orbit perturbed by Earth.

==== Status ====
This has led some scientists to argue that the Moon could be identified as a planet, both historically and qualitatively, adding that its mass would be enough to clear its orbit around the Sun if it were on its own. This would imply that the Earth-Moon system is a double planet, which is conflicting with the definition of what qualifies as a planet by the International Astronomical Union (IAU) standards organization. The IAU though has no well established definition for planetary binary systems, or for what constitutes a double planet system, but has stated and most scientists agree that this would require the Moon-Earth barycentre to be outside of Earth.

=== Direction ===
When viewed from the north celestial pole (that is, from the approximate direction of the star Polaris) the Moon orbits Earth anticlockwise and Earth orbits the Sun anticlockwise, and the Moon and Earth rotate on their own axes anticlockwise.

The right-hand rule can be used to indicate the direction of the angular velocity. If the thumb of the right hand points to the north celestial pole, its fingers curl in the direction that the Moon orbits Earth, Earth orbits the Sun, and the Moon and Earth rotate on their own axes.

== Properties ==
Sizes of Earth, Moon, and Moon's orbit to scale

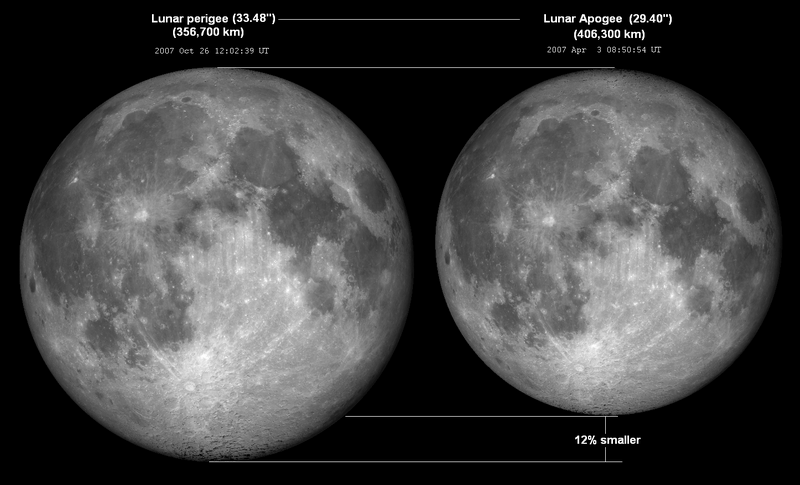
Comparison of the Moon's apparent size at lunar perigee and apogee

The properties of the orbit described in this section are approximations. The Moon's orbit around Earth has many variations (perturbations) due to the gravitational attraction of the Sun and planets, the study of which (lunar theory) has a long history.

Moon reaches a maximum speed of 1,082 metres per second (2,420 mph) and slows down to a minimum of ~964 metres per second (2,160 mph). With a mean orbital speed around the barycentre of 1.022 km/s (2,290 mph), the Moon covers a distance of approximately its diameter, or about half a degree on the celestial sphere, each hour.

=== Elliptic shape ===
The orbit of the Moon has an eccentricity of 0.0549, with perigee and apogee distances of 363,300 km (225744 mi) and 405,507 km (251970 mi) respectively (a difference of 11.6%).

The full Moon's apparent size as seen from Earth depends on how close it occurs to perigee. A full moon near perigee is known as a "supermoon". The largest possible apparent diameter of the Moon is some 12% larger than the smallest; the apparent area is then 25% greater and so is the amount of light it reflects toward Earth.

Minimum, mean and maximum distances of the Moon from Earth with its angular diameter as seen from Earth's surface, to scale. Scroll to right to see the Moon.

=== Elongation ===
The Moon's elongation is its angular distance east of the Sun at any time. At new moon, it is zero and the Moon is said to be in conjunction. At full moon, the elongation is 180° and it is said to be in opposition. In both cases, the Moon is in syzygy, that is, the Sun, Moon and Earth are nearly aligned. When elongation is either 90° or 270°, the Moon is said to be in quadrature.

=== Precession ===
Animation of Moon orbit around Earth
Moon · Earth
Top: polar view; bottom: equatorial view

The orientation of the orbit is not fixed in space but rotates over time. This orbital precession is called apsidal precession and is the rotation of the Moon's orbit within the orbital plane, i.e. the axes of the ellipse change direction. The lunar orbit's major axis – the longest diameter of the orbit, joining its nearest and farthest points, the perigee and apogee, respectively – makes one complete revolution every 8.85 Earth years, or 3,232.6054 days, as it rotates slowly in the same direction as the Moon itself (direct motion) – meaning precesses eastward by 360°. The Moon's apsidal precession is distinct from the nodal precession of its orbital plane and axial precession of the moon itself.

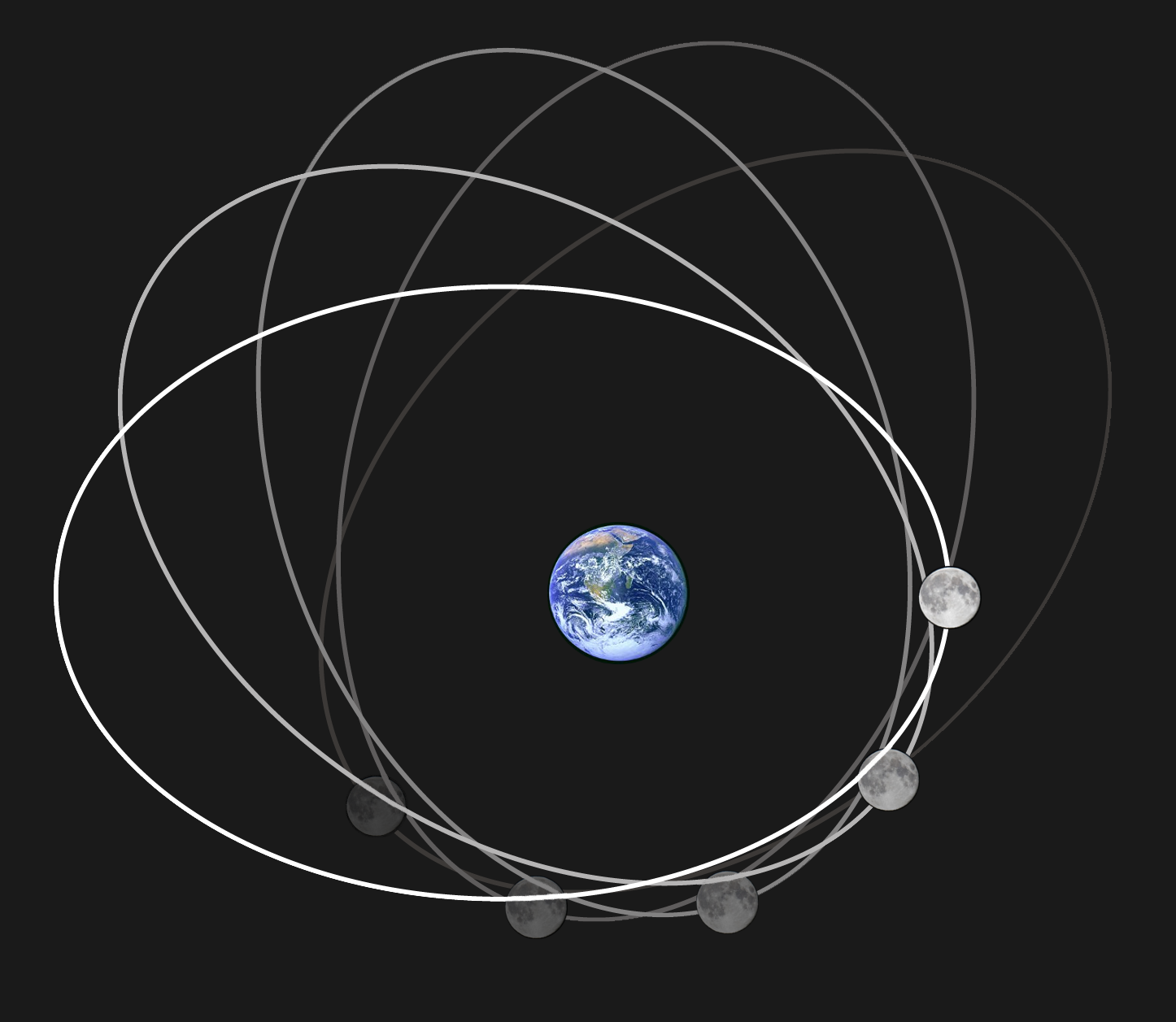
Exaggerated apsidal precession of the Moon's orbit

=== Inclination ===
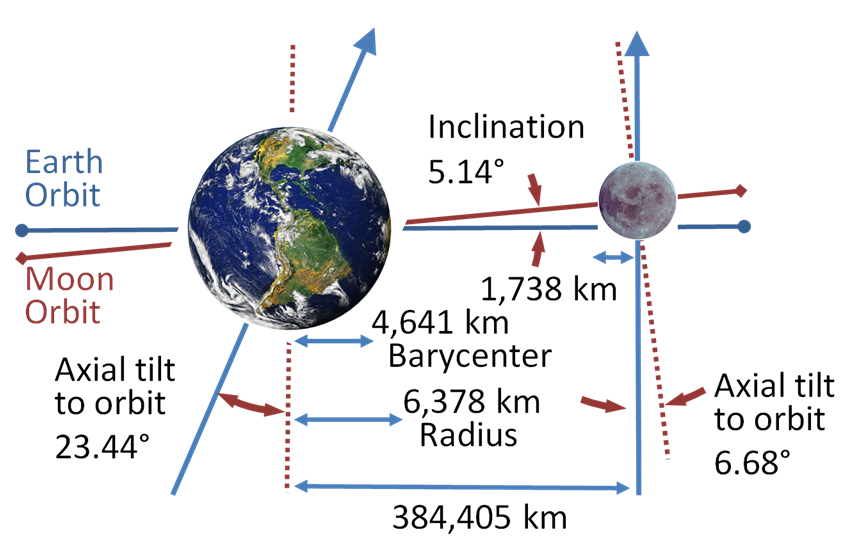
Orbital inclination—the Moon's orbit is inclined by 5.14° to the ecliptic. This shows the specific configuration at major northern lunistice. At such times, the Earth's north pole is toward the Moon and the Moon is north of the ecliptic.

The mean inclination of the lunar orbit to the ecliptic plane is 5.145°. Theoretical considerations show that the present inclination relative to the ecliptic plane arose by tidal evolution from an earlier near-Earth orbit with a fairly constant inclination relative to Earth's equator. It would require an inclination of this earlier orbit of about 10° to the equator to produce a present inclination of 5° to the ecliptic. It is thought that originally the inclination to the equator was near zero, but it could have been increased to 10° through the influence of planetesimals passing near the Moon while falling to the Earth. If this had not happened, the Moon would now lie much closer to the ecliptic and eclipses would be much more frequent.

The rotational axis of the Moon is not perpendicular to its orbital plane, so the lunar equator is not in the plane of its orbit, but is inclined to it by a constant value of 6.688° (the obliquity). As was discovered by Jacques Cassini in 1722, the rotational axis of the Moon precesses with the same rate as its orbital plane, but is 180° out of phase. Therefore, the angle between the ecliptic and the lunar equator is always 1.543°, even though the rotational axis of the Moon is not fixed with respect to the stars. It also means that when the Moon is farthest north of the ecliptic, the centre of the part seen from Earth is about 6.7° south of the lunar equator and the south pole is visible, whereas when the Moon is farthest south of the ecliptic the centre of the visible part is 6.7° north of the equator and the north pole is visible. This is called libration in latitude.

==== Nodes ====
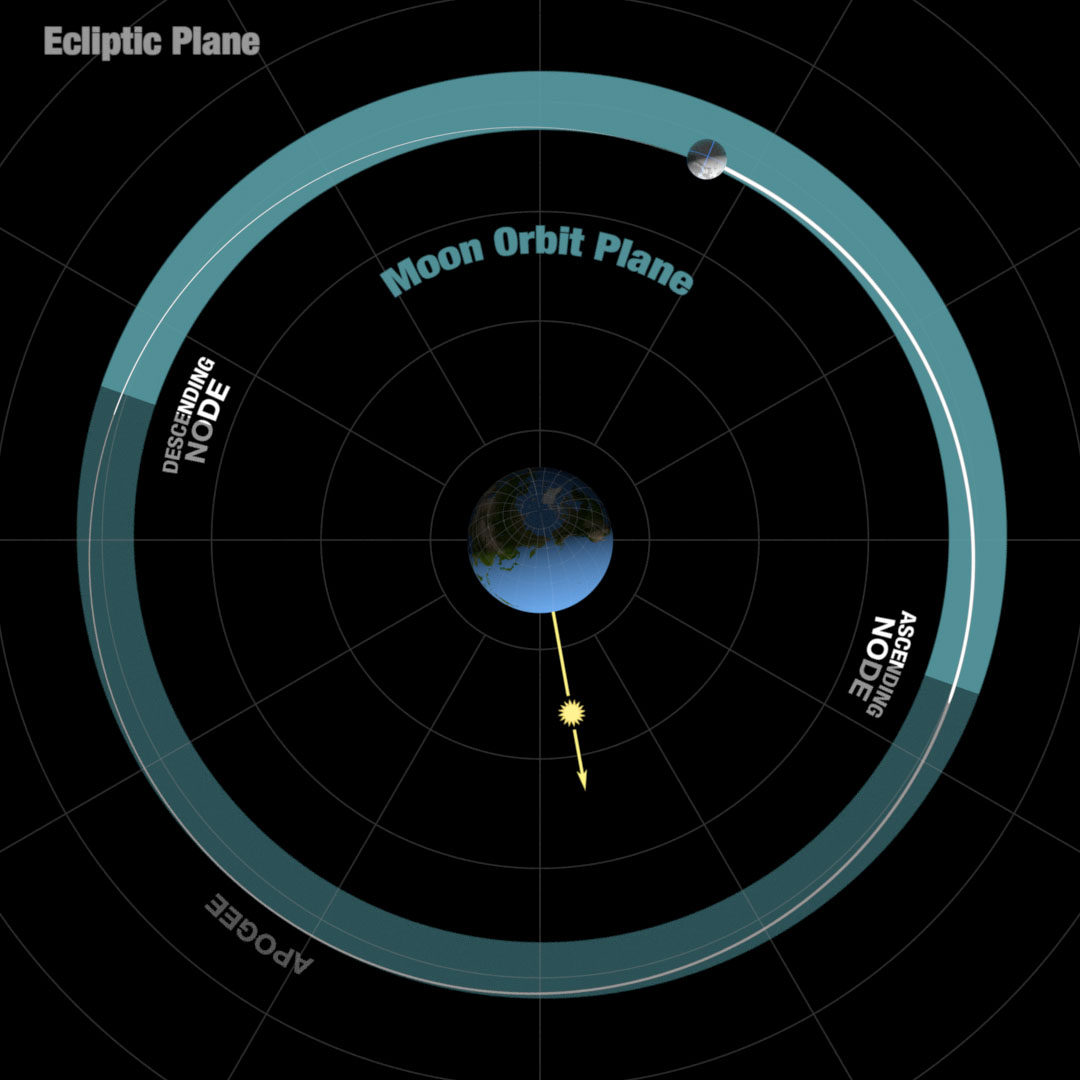
Lunar orbit and path area, with nodes

The nodes are points at which the Moon's orbit crosses the ecliptic. The Moon crosses the same node every 27.2122 days, an interval called the draconic month or draconitic month. The line of nodes, the intersection between the two respective planes, has a retrograde motion: for an observer on Earth, it rotates westward along the ecliptic with a period of 18.6 years or 19.3549° per year. When viewed from the celestial north, the nodes move clockwise around Earth, opposite to Earth's own spin and its revolution around the Sun. An eclipse of the Moon or Sun can occur when the nodes align with the Sun, roughly every 173.3 days. Lunar orbit inclination also determines eclipses; shadows cross when nodes coincide with full and new moon when the Sun, Earth, and Moon align in three dimensions.

In effect, this means that the "tropical year" on the Moon is only 347 days long. This is called the draconic year or eclipse year. The "seasons" on the Moon fit into this period. For about half of this draconic year, the Sun is north of the lunar equator (but at most 1.543°), and for the other half, it is south of the lunar equator. The effect of these seasons, however, is minor compared to the difference between lunar night and lunar day. At the lunar poles, instead of usual lunar days and nights of about 15 Earth days, the Sun will be "up" for 173 days as it will be "down"; polar sunrise and sunset takes 18 days each year. "Up" here means that the centre of the Sun is above the horizon. Lunar polar sunrises and sunsets occur around the time of eclipses (solar or lunar). For example, at the Solar eclipse of March 9, 2016, the Moon was near its descending node, and the Sun was near the point in the sky where the equator of the Moon crosses the ecliptic. When the Sun reaches that point, the centre of the Sun sets at the lunar north pole and rises at the lunar south pole.

The solar eclipse of September 1 of the same year, the Moon was near its ascending node, and the Sun was near the point in the sky where the equator of the Moon crosses the ecliptic. When the Sun reaches that point, the centre of the Sun rises at the lunar north pole and sets at the lunar south pole.

==== Inclination to the equator and lunar standstill ====
Every 18.6 years, the angle between the Moon's orbit and Earth's equator reaches a maximum of 28°36′, the sum of Earth's equatorial tilt (23°27′) and the Moon's orbital inclination (5°09′) to the ecliptic. This is called major lunar standstill. Around this time, the Moon's declination will vary from −28°36′ to +28°36′. Conversely, 9.3 years later, the angle between the Moon's orbit and Earth's equator reaches its minimum of 18°20′. This is called a minor lunar standstill. The last minor lunar standstill was in October 2015. At that time the descending node was lined up with the equinox (the point in the sky having right ascension zero and declination zero). The nodes are moving west by about 19° per year. The Sun crosses a given node about 20 days earlier each year.

When the inclination of the Moon's orbit to the Earth's equator is at its minimum of 18°20′, the centre of the Moon's disk will be above the horizon every day from latitudes less than 70°43' (90° − 18°20' – 57' parallax) north or south. When the inclination is at its maximum of 28°36', the centre of the Moon's disk will be above the horizon every day only from latitudes less than 60°27' (90° − 28°36' – 57' parallax) north or south.

At higher latitudes, there will be a period of at least one day each month when the Moon does not rise, but there will also be a period of at least one day each month when the Moon does not set. This is similar to the seasonal behaviour of the Sun, but with a period of 27.2 days instead of 365 days. Note that a point on the Moon can actually be visible when it is about 34 arc minutes below the horizon, due to atmospheric refraction.

Because of the inclination of the Moon's orbit with respect to the Earth's equator, the Moon is above the horizon at the North and South Pole for almost two weeks every month, even though the Sun is below the horizon for six months at a time. The period from moonrise to moonrise at the poles is a tropical month, about 27.3 days, quite close to the sidereal period. When the Sun is the furthest below the horizon (winter solstice), the Moon will be full when it is at its highest point. When the Moon is in Gemini it will be above the horizon at the North Pole, and when it is in Sagittarius it will be up at the South Pole.

The Moon's light is used by zooplankton in the Arctic when the Sun is below the horizon for months and must have been helpful to the animals that lived in Arctic and Antarctic regions when the climate was warmer.

==== Scale model ====
Scale model of the Earth–Moon system (respecting sizes and distances), utilizing the mean radii of both bodies and mean distance of the orbit. Scroll right to find the Moon.

== History of observations and measurements ==
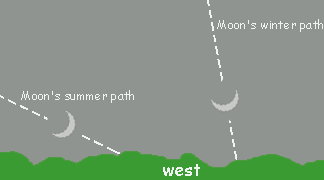
The apparent trajectory of the Moon in the sky seen from Earth each night is like a wide ellipse, although the path depends on the time of the year and latitude.

About 1000 BC, the Babylonians were the first human civilization known to have kept a consistent record of lunar observations. Clay tablets from that period, which have been found in Iraq, are inscribed with cuneiform writing recording the times and dates of moonrises and moonsets, the stars that the Moon passed close by, and the time differences between rising and setting of both the Sun and the Moon around the time of a full moon. Babylonian astronomy discovered the three main periods of the Moon's motion and used data analysis to build lunar calendars that extended well into the future. This use of detailed, systematic observations to make predictions based on experimental data may be classified as the first scientific study in human history. However, the Babylonians seem to have lacked any geometric or physical interpretation of their data, and they could not predict future lunar eclipses (though "warnings" were issued before likely eclipse times).

Ancient Greek astronomers were the first to introduce and analyze mathematical models of the motion of objects in the sky. Ptolemy described lunar motion by using a well-defined geometric model of epicycles and evection.

The relation of the Moon, Earth and Sun has been studied since antiquity and has therefore been called the oldest three-body problem.

Isaac Newton was the first to develop a complete theory of motion, Newtonian mechanics. The observations of the lunar motion were the main test of his theory.

== Lunar periods ==
Name	Value (days)	Definition
Sidereal month	27.321662	with respect to the distant stars (13.36874634 passes per solar orbit)
Synodic month	29.530589	with respect to the Sun (phases of the Moon, 12.36874634 passes per solar orbit)
Tropical month	27.321582	with respect to the vernal point (precesses in ~26,000 years)
Anomalistic month	27.554550	with respect to the perigee (precesses in 3232.6054 days = 8.850578 years)
Draconic month	27.212221	with respect to the ascending node (precesses in 6793.4765 days = 18.5996 years)

There are several different periods associated with the lunar orbit. The sidereal month is the time it takes to make one complete orbit around Earth with respect to the fixed stars. It is about 27.32 days. The synodic month is the time it takes the Moon to reach the same visual phase. This varies notably throughout the year, but averages around 29.53 days. The synodic period is longer than the sidereal period because the Earth–Moon system moves in its orbit around the Sun during each sidereal month, hence a longer period is required to achieve a similar alignment of Earth, the Sun, and the Moon. The anomalistic month is the time between perigees and is about 27.55 days. The Earth–Moon separation determines the strength of the lunar tide raising force.

The draconic month is the time from ascending node to ascending node. The time between two successive passes of the same ecliptic longitude is called the tropical month. The latter periods are slightly different from the sidereal month.

The average length of a calendar month (a twelfth of a year) is about 30.4 days. This is not a lunar period, though the calendar month is historically related to the visible lunar phase.

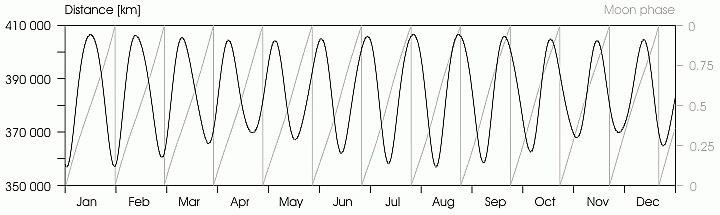
The Moon's distance from Earth and Moon phases in 2014. Moon phases: 0 (1)—new moon, 0.25—first quarter, 0.5—full moon, 0.75—last quarter

== Tidal evolution ==
The gravitational attraction that the Moon exerts on Earth is the cause of tides in both the ocean and the solid Earth; the Sun has a smaller tidal influence. The solid Earth responds quickly to any change in the tidal forcing, the distortion taking the form of an ellipsoid with the high points roughly beneath the Moon and on the opposite side of Earth. This is a result of the high speed of seismic waves within the solid Earth.

However the speed of seismic waves is not infinite and, together with the effect of energy loss within the Earth, this causes a slight delay between the passage of the maximum forcing due to the Moon across and the maximum Earth tide. As the Earth rotates faster than the Moon travels around its orbit, this small angle produces a gravitational torque which slows the Earth and accelerates the Moon in its orbit.

In the case of the ocean tides, the speed of tidal waves in the ocean is far slower than the speed of the Moon's tidal forcing. As a result, the ocean is never in near equilibrium with the tidal forcing. Instead, the forcing generates the long ocean waves which propagate around the ocean basins until eventually losing their energy through turbulence, either in the deep ocean or on shallow continental shelves.

Although the ocean's response is the more complex of the two, it is possible to split the ocean tides into a small ellipsoid term which affects the Moon plus a second term which has no effect. The ocean's ellipsoid term also slows the Earth and accelerates the Moon, but because the ocean dissipates so much tidal energy, the present ocean tides have an order of magnitude greater effect than the solid Earth tides.

Because of the tidal torque, caused by the ellipsoids, some of Earth's angular (or rotational) momentum is gradually being transferred to the rotation of the Earth–Moon pair around their mutual centre of mass, called the barycentre.

This slightly greater orbital angular momentum causes the Earth–Moon distance to increase at approximately 38 millimetres per year. Conservation of angular momentum means that Earth's axial rotation is gradually slowing, and because of this its day lengthens by approximately 24 microseconds every year (excluding glacial rebound). Both figures are valid only for the current configuration of the continents. Tidal rhythmites from 620 million years ago show that, over hundreds of millions of years, the Moon receded at an average rate of 22 mm (0.87 in) per year (2200 km or 0.56% or the Earth-Moon distance per hundred million years) and the day lengthened at an average rate of 12 microseconds per year (or 20 minutes per hundred million years), both about half of their current values. From 650 to 280 million years ago, through two intervals where Earth's rotation decelerated, the Moon moved approximately 20,000 km further away, which increased the daylength on Earth by 2.2 hours.

The present high rate may be due to near resonance between natural ocean frequencies and tidal frequencies. Another explanation is that in the past the Earth rotated much faster, a day possibly lasting only 9 hours on the early Earth. The resulting tidal waves in the ocean would have then been much shorter and it would have been more difficult for the long wavelength tidal forcing to excite the short wavelength tides.

The Moon is gradually receding from Earth into a higher orbit. Evidence from tidal rhythmites indicates that the Moon's orbital distance was only about 70% of its present value 3.2 billion years ago. As a result, the synodic month was about 43% shorter in absolute duration than today. Because Earth rotated faster at the time, however, a solar day lasted only about 13 hours, so the number of solar days per month differed less from the present value. Calculations suggest that this would continue for about 50 billion years. By that time, Earth and the Moon would be in a mutual spin–orbit resonance or tidal locking, in which the Moon will orbit Earth in about 47 days (currently 27 days), and both the Moon and Earth would rotate around their axes in the same time, always facing each other with the same side. This has already happened to the Moon—the same side always faces Earth—and is also slowly happening to the Earth. However, the slowdown of Earth's rotation is not occurring fast enough for the rotation to lengthen to a month before other effects change the situation: approximately 2.3 billion years from now, the increase of the Sun's radiation will have caused Earth's oceans to evaporate, removing the bulk of the tidal friction and acceleration.

== Libration ==
Animation of the Moon as it cycles through its phases. The apparent wobbling of the Moon is known as libration.

The Moon is in synchronous rotation, meaning that it keeps the same face toward Earth at all times. This synchronous rotation is only true on average because the Moon's orbit has a definite eccentricity. As a result, the angular velocity of the Moon varies as it orbits Earth and hence is not always equal to the Moon's rotational velocity which is more constant. When the Moon is at its perigee, its orbital motion is faster than its rotation. At that time the Moon is a bit ahead in its orbit with respect to its rotation about its axis, and this creates a perspective effect which makes up to eight degrees of longitude of its eastern far side visible. Conversely, when the Moon reaches its apogee, its orbital motion is slower than its rotation, revealing eight degrees of longitude of its western far side. This is referred to as optical libration in longitude.

The Moon's axis of rotation is inclined by in total 6.7° relative to the normal to the plane of the ecliptic. This leads to a similar perspective effect in the north–south direction that is referred to as optical libration in latitude, which allows one to see almost 7° of latitude beyond the pole on the far side. Finally, because the Moon is only about 60 Earth radii away from Earth's centre of mass, an observer at the equator who observes the Moon throughout the night moves laterally by one Earth diameter. This gives rise to a diurnal libration, which allows one to view an additional one degree's worth of lunar longitude. For the same reason, observers at both of Earth's geographical poles would be able to see one additional degree's worth of libration in latitude.

Besides these "optical librations" caused by the change in perspective for an observer on Earth, there are also "physical librations" which are actual nutations of the direction of the pole of rotation of the Moon in space: but these are very small.

== See also ==
- Ernest William Brown
- Double planet
- List of orbits
- ELP2000
- Ephemeris
- Jet Propulsion Laboratory Development Ephemeris
- Lunar Laser Ranging experiment
- Milankovitch cycles
- Orbital elements
