= Orbital precession =

In celestial mechanics, orbital precession may refer to:

- Apsidal precession, where the major axis of an elliptical orbit cycles its orientation within its orbital plane.
- Nodal precession, where non-spherical objects cause orbiting objects to change their orbits.

Not to be confused with:

- Axial precession, where the rotation axis of a spinning object traces a conical path like a top.
