= Lunar node =

Intersection of Moon's orbit with Earth's ecliptic

The lunar nodes are the two points where the Moon's orbital path crosses the ecliptic, the Sun's apparent yearly path on the celestial sphere.

A lunar node is either of the two orbital nodes of the Moon; that is, the two points at which the orbit of the Moon intersects the orbit of Earth (the ecliptic). The ascending or north node is where the Moon moves into the northern ecliptic hemisphere, while the descending or south node is where the Moon enters the southern ecliptic hemisphere.

They are the reason for eclipse season, being the intersection necessary for the alignment of Sun, Earth and Moon.

== Motion ==
The line of nodes, which is also the intersection between the two respective planes, rotates (precesses) with a period of 18.6 years or 19.35° per year. When viewed from the celestial north, the nodes move clockwise around Earth, I.e. with a retrograde motion (opposite to Earth's own spin and its revolution around the Sun). So the time from one node crossing to the next (see eclipse season) is approximately a half-year minus half of 19.1 days -- or about 173 days.

Because the orbital plane of the Moon precesses in space, the lunar nodes also precess around the ecliptic, completing one revolution (called a draconic period or nodal period) in 18.612958 years (6,798.383 days). (This is not the same as a saros of 18.03 years) The same cycle measured against an inertial frame of reference, such as International Celestial Reference System (ICRS), a coordinate system relative to the fixed stars, is 18.599525 years.

== Eclipses ==
Nodal precession of the lunar nodes as the Earth revolves around the Sun causes an eclipse season approximately every six months

A lunar eclipse can occur only when the full Moon is near either lunar node (within 11° 38' ecliptic longitude), while a solar eclipse can occur only when the new Moon is near either lunar node (within 17° 25').

Both solar eclipses of July 2000 (on the 1st and 31st days) occurred around the time when the Moon was at its ascending node. Ascending-node eclipses recur after one draconic year on average, which is about 0.94901 Gregorian year, as do descending-node eclipses.

An Eclipse of the Moon or Sun can occur when the nodes align with the Sun, roughly every 173.3 days. Lunar orbit inclination also determines eclipses; shadows cross when nodes coincide with full and new moon when the Sun, Earth, and Moon align in three dimensions.

In effect, this means that the "tropical year" on the Moon is only 347 days long. This is called the draconic year (or eclipse year). The "seasons" on the Moon fit into this period. For about half of this draconic year, the Sun is north of the lunar equator (but at most 1.543°), and for the other half, it is south of the lunar equator. Obviously, the effect of these seasons is minor compared to the difference between lunar night and lunar day. At the lunar poles, instead of usual lunar days and nights of about 15 Earth days, the Sun will be "up" for 173 days as it will be "down"; polar sunrise and sunset takes 18 days each year. "Up" here means that the centre of the Sun is above the horizon. Lunar polar sunrises and sunsets occur around the time of eclipses (solar or lunar). For example, at the Solar eclipse of March 9, 2016, the Moon was near its descending node, and the Sun was near the point in the sky where the equator of the Moon crosses the ecliptic. When the Sun reaches that point, the center of the Sun sets at the lunar north pole and rises at the lunar south pole.

== Names and symbols ==
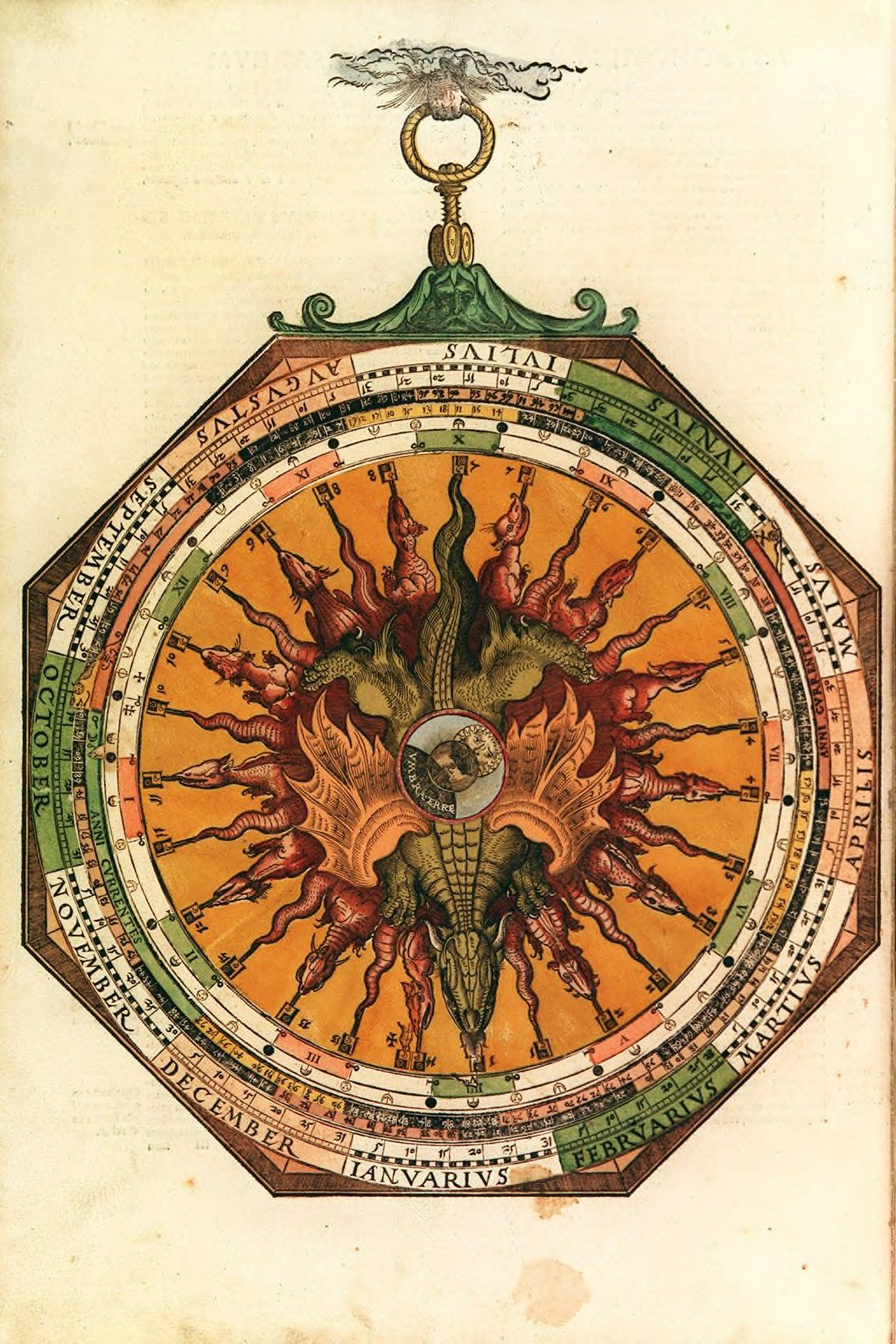
The dragon in Peter Apian's Astronomicum Caesareum, 1540

The nodes are called by different names in different cultures of the world.

In medieval Arabic texts, alongside the seven classical planets, it was believed that an eighth pseudo-planet was the cause of solar and lunar eclipses, termed al-Tinnīn (the Dragon) or al-Jawzahr (from Classical Persian Gawzahr). The planet was split into two parts representing the lunar nodes, termed the Head (ra’s) and Tail (dhanab) of the mythological dragon. Similarly, the nodes are termed rosh ha-teli u-zenavo (ראש התלי וזנבו) in Hebrew, and caput draconis (head of the dragon) or cauda draconis (tail of the dragon) in Latin. The ascending node is referred to as the dragon's head with the astronomical or astrological symbol of ☊ and the descending node is known as the dragon's tail with the symbol ☋.

In Hindu astronomy, the nodes are considered with the seven planets to form the nine Navagrahas; the ascending node ☊ is called Rahu and the descending node ☋ is called Ketu. Rāhu (Sanskrit: राहु,) is one of the nine major celestial bodies (navagraha) in Hindu texts and the king of meteors. It represents the ascension of the Moon in its precessional orbit around the Earth, also referred as the north lunar node, and along with Ketu, is a "shadow planet" that causes eclipses. Despite having no physical existence, Rahu has been allocated the status of the planet by ancient seers owing to its strong influence in astrology. Rahu is usually paired with Ketu, the other shadow planet. The time of day considered to be under the influence of Rahu is called Rāhu kāla and is considered inauspicious.

In Tibetan astrology (partially based on the Kalachakra Tantra) these nodes are respectively named Rahu and Kalagni.

== Extremes ==
=== Inclination extremes ===
Every 18.6 years, the angle between the Moon's orbit and Earth's equator reaches a maximum of 28°36′, the sum of Earth's equatorial tilt (23°27′) and the Moon's orbital inclination (5°09′) to the ecliptic. This is called major lunar standstill. Around this time, the Moon's declination will vary from −28°36′ to +28°36′. Conversely, 9.3 years later, the angle between the Moon's orbit and Earth's equator reaches its minimum of 18°20′. This is called a minor lunar standstill. The last lunar standstill was a minor standstill in October 2015. At that time the descending node was lined up with the equinox (the point in the sky having right ascension zero and declination zero). The nodes are moving west by about 19° per year. The Sun crosses a given node about 20 days earlier each year.

When the inclination of the Moon's orbit to the Earth's equator is at its minimum of 18°20′, the centre of the Moon's disk will be above the horizon every day from latitudes less than 70°43' (90° − 18°20' – 57' parallax) north or south. When the inclination is at its maximum of 28°36', the centre of the Moon's disk will be above the horizon every day only from latitudes less than 60°27' (90° − 28°36' – 57' parallax) north or south.

At higher latitudes, there will be a period of at least one day each month when the Moon does not rise, but there will also be a period of at least one day each month when the Moon does not set. This is similar to the seasonal behaviour of the Sun, but with a period of 27.2 days instead of 365 days. Note that a point on the Moon can actually be visible when it is about 34 arc minutes below the horizon, due to atmospheric refraction.

Because of the inclination of the Moon's orbit with respect to the Earth's equator, the Moon is above the horizon at the North and South Pole for almost two weeks every month, even though the Sun is below the horizon for six months at a time. The period from moonrise to moonrise at the poles is a tropical month, about 27.3 days, quite close to the sidereal period. When the Sun is the furthest below the horizon (winter solstice), the Moon will be full when it is at its highest point. When the Moon is in Gemini it will be above the horizon at the North Pole, and when it is in Sagittarius it will be up at the South Pole.

The Moon's light is used by zooplankton in the Arctic when the Sun is below the horizon for months and must have been helpful to the animals that lived in Arctic and Antarctic regions when the climate was warmer.

=== Declination extremes ===
The Moon's orbit is inclined about 5.14° to the ecliptic; hence, the Moon can be up to about 5° north or south of the ecliptic. The ecliptic is inclined about 23.44° to the celestial equator, whose plane is perpendicular to the rotational axis of Earth. As a result, once during the 18.6-year nodal period (when the ascending node of the Moon's orbit coincides with the vernal equinox), the Moon's declination reaches a maximum and minimum (northern and southern extremes): about 28.6° from the celestial equator. Therefore, the moonrise or moonset azimuth has its northern- and southernmost points on the horizon; the Moon at culmination has its lowest and highest altitude (when the body transits the meridian); and first sightings of the new moon potentially have their latest times. Furthermore, occultations by the Moon of the Pleiades star cluster, which is over 4° north of the ecliptic, occur during a comparatively brief period once every nodal period.

== Effect on tides ==
The precession of the lunar nodes has a small effect on Earth's tides – atmospheric, oceanic, or crustal. The U.S. National Oceanic and Atmospheric Administration (NOAA) determines mean lower low water (MLLW) at a location by averaging the height of the lowest tide recorded at that location each day during a 19-year recording period, known as the National Tidal Datum Epoch. The 19-year recording period is the nearest full-year count to the 18.6-year cycle of the lunar nodes.

In conjunction with sea level rise caused by global warming, lunar nodal precession is predicted to contribute to a rapid rise in the frequency of coastal flooding throughout the 2030s.

== See also ==
- Eclipse
- Lunar standstill
- Orbit of the Moon
