= Gochihr (Zoroastrianism) =

Gochihr (Persian: گوچهر, also spelled Gozihr) is a dragon in Iranian mythology.

== Etymology ==
Gochihr is the Middle Persian development of old Iranian *gau-čiθra-, attested in the Younger Avesta in the form gaočiθra-, meaning “bearing the seed, having the origin of cattle”.

== In scripture ==
=== Bundahishn ===
He plays a significant role in the eschatological narrative of the Bundahishn, where his rapid decent into the earth will cause an eruption of molten metal, leading to the rejuvenation of the world and his own demise.

== In Islamic tradition ==
Gochihr (الجوزهر Jawzihr in Arabic) was later adopted by Muslim astronomers and astrologers where it came to signify the moon, but was also used for the nodes of any other named planets.

== See also ==
- Jörmungandr
- Fall of man
- Star and crescent
- Rāhu
- Ketu
