= Ephemeride Lunaire Parisienne =

Lunar theory

Éphéméride Lunaire Parisienne is a lunar theory developed by Jean Chapront, Michelle Chapront-Touzé, and others at the Bureau des Longitudes in the 1970s to 1990s.

== Method ==
ELP gives a series expansion of the orbital elements and the coordinates of the Moon. The authors refer to it as a "semi-analytical" theory because they developed their expressions not purely symbolically, but introduced numerical values for orbital constants from the outset; but they also constructed partial derivatives of all terms with respect to these constants, so they could make corrections afterwards to reach the final solution.

ELP has been fitted not directly to observations, but to the numerical integrations known as the Jet Propulsion Laboratory Development Ephemeris (which includes the Lunar Ephemerides), that in their turn have been fitted to actual astronomical observations. ELP was fitted initially to the DE200, but improved parameters have been published up to DE405.

Even though ELP contains more than 20,000 periodic terms, it is not sufficiently accurate to predict the Moon's position to the centimeter accuracy with which it can be measured by LLR. An attempt was made to improve the planetary terms with the ELP/MPP02 lunar theory, but heuristic corrections remained necessary.

== Advantages ==
A theory like the ELP has two advantages over numerical integration:

- It can be truncated to a lower level of accuracy for faster computation, which made it suitable for implementing in programs for micro computers.
- It can be evaluated for an unlimited period of time, unlike the results of a numerical integration which has specific moments of begin and end; however the accuracy deteriorates into the remote past or future, depending on the quality of the polynomials that model the so-called secular (long-term) changes in the orbital parameters. For the Moon, the main secular factor is tidal acceleration: The magnitude of that effect has become better known after the initial version of the ELP was published, due to a longer base line of LLR observations.

== Availability and use ==
Upon popular demand, the Chapronts also published ELP2000-85 and a book, Lunar Programs and Tables with a truncated version of their theory and with programs, that could be used by historians and amateur astronomers to compute the position of the Moon themselves.

Jean Meeus used the ELP in his popular book Astronomical Algorithms (1991, 1998).

The ELP was also used to compute NASA's 5000-year canon of eclipses.

== See also ==
- VSOP87
