= First point of Aries =

Point on the celestial sphere

The first point of Aries defines the ecliptic coordinate of (0°, 0°). It is on the celestial equator at both the left and right extremes of the sky chart, with the ecliptic (the orange dotted sine curve) passing through it.

The first point of Aries, also known as the cusp of Aries or the vernal point, is the location of the March equinox (the vernal equinox in the northern hemisphere, and the autumnal equinox in the southern), used as a reference point in celestial coordinate systems. In diagrams using such coordinate systems, it is often indicated with the symbol ♈︎. Named for the constellation of Aries, it is one of the two points on the celestial sphere at which the celestial equator crosses the ecliptic, the other being the first point of Libra, located exactly 180° from it. Due to precession of the equinoxes since the positions were originally named in antiquity, the position of the Sun when at the March equinox is now in Pisces; when it is at the September equinox, it is in Virgo (as of J2000).

Along its yearly path through the zodiac, the Sun meets the celestial equator as it travels from south to north at the first point of Aries, and from north to south at the first point of Libra. The first point of Aries is considered to be the celestial "prime meridian" from which right ascension is calculated.

== History ==
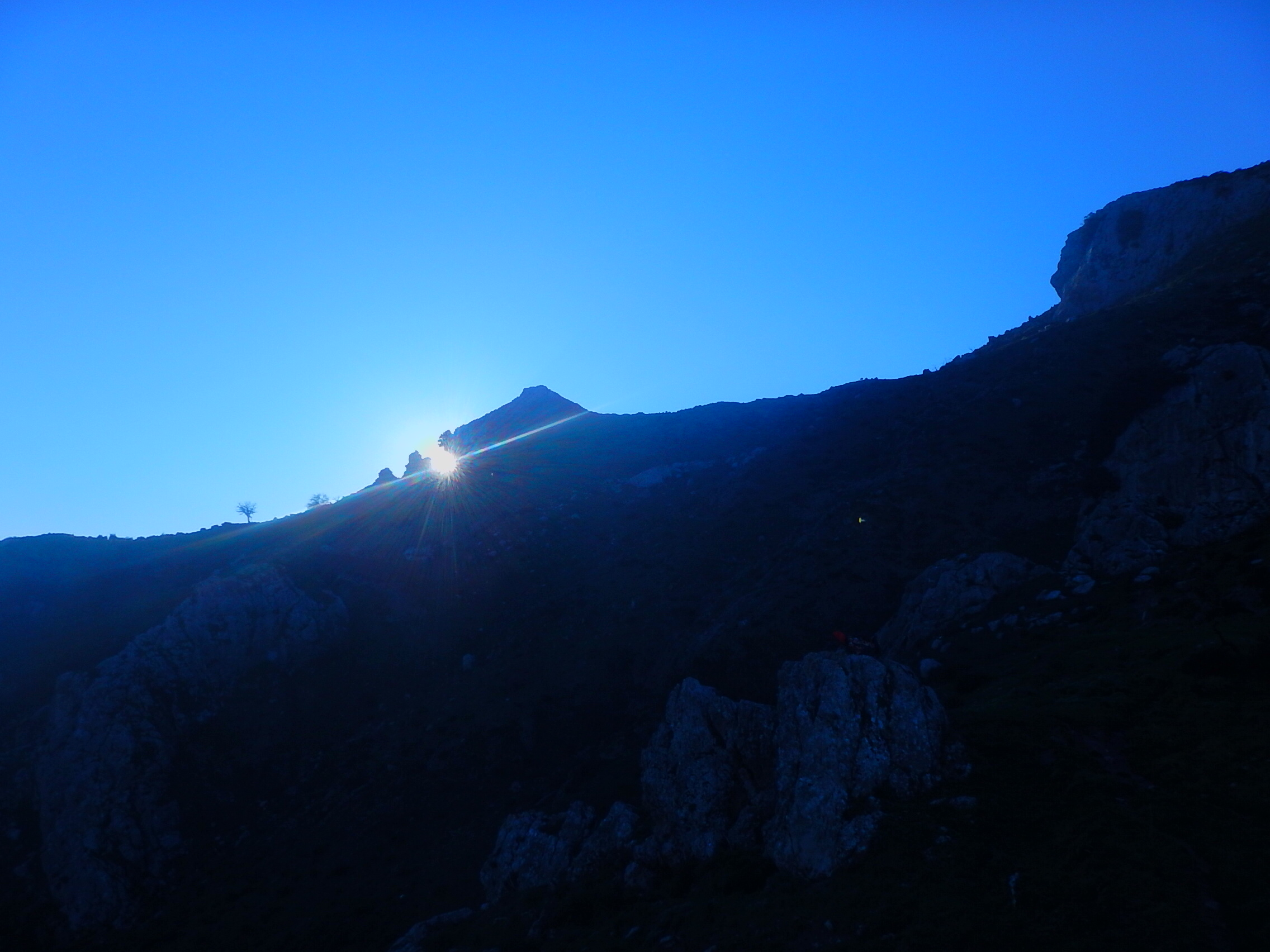
Equinox seen from the site of Pizzo Vento at Fondachelli-Fantina, Sicily.

The choice of starting position from which to measure the Sun's motion across the celestial sphere is arbitrary. The equinoxes are preferred as an equinox marks the point in time when the Sun has neither northern nor southern declination but is crossing the celestial equator. Of the two possible equinoxes the ancient Greeks chose the March equinox as the starting point. This coincided with the festival of Hilaria, a time of optimism and beginnings where farmers began to sow or observed the first growth and blossoming of trees and summer crops. The naming of Aries is late in the Babylonian zodiac where the equinox was in its earliest tradition marked as in the early Middle Bronze Age by actual coincidence with the Pleiades. The time also corresponds to the time of castration of male calves, mules and donkeys, Sanguia on the vernal equinox and marked the start of spring proper.

The first point of Aries is so called because, when Hipparchus defined it in 130 BCE, it was located in the western extreme of the constellation of Aries, near its border with Pisces and the star γ Arietis. Due to the Sun's eastward movement across the sky throughout the year, this western end of Aries was the point at which the Sun entered the constellation, hence the name first point of Aries.

== Definition ==
Due to Earth's axial precession, this point gradually moves westward at a rate of about one degree every 72 years. This means that, since the time of Hipparchus, it has shifted across the sky by about 30°, and is currently located within Pisces, near its border with Aquarius. The Sun now appears in Aries from late April until mid-May, though the constellation is still associated with the beginning of the northern spring.

The first point of Aries is important to the fields of astronomy, nautical navigation and astrology. Navigational ephemeris tables record the geographic position of the first point of Aries as the reference for position of navigational stars. Due to the slow precession of the equinoxes, the zenith view (above a location) of constellations at a time of year from a given location have slowly moved west (by using solar epochs the drift is known). The tropical Zodiac is similarly affected and no longer corresponds with the constellations (the Cusp of Libra today is located within Virgo). In sidereal astrology, by contrast, the first point of Aries remains aligned with the Aries constellation.

== See also ==
- Ras Hammel "the head of the ram"
