= Nodal precession =

Rotation of a satellite as it orbits

Nodal precession is the precession of the orbital plane (more specifically, the line of nodes) of a satellite around the rotational axis of an astronomical body such as Earth. This precession is due to the non-spherical nature of a rotating body, which creates a non-uniform gravitational field. The following discussion relates to low Earth orbit of artificial satellites, which have no measurable effect on the motion of Earth. The nodal precession of more massive, natural satellites like the Moon is more complex.

Around a spherical body, an orbital plane would remain fixed in space around the gravitational primary body. However, most bodies rotate, which causes an equatorial bulge. This bulge creates a gravitational effect that causes orbits to precess around the rotational axis of the primary body.

The direction of precession is opposite the direction of revolution. For a typical prograde orbit around Earth (that is, in the direction of primary body's rotation), the longitude of the ascending node decreases, that is the node precesses westward. If the orbit is retrograde, this increases the longitude of the ascending node, that is the node precesses eastward. This nodal precession enables sun-synchronous orbits to maintain a nearly constant angle relative to the Sun.

== Description ==
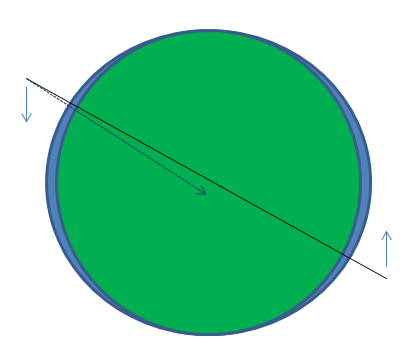
Equatorial bulge torques a satellite orbit, leading to nodal precession

A non-rotating body of planetary scale or larger would be pulled by gravity into a spherical shape. Virtually all bodies rotate, however. The centrifugal force deforms the body so that it has an equatorial bulge. Because of the bulge of the central body, the gravitational force on a satellite is not directed toward the center of the central body, but is offset toward its equator. Whichever hemisphere of the central body the satellite lies over, it is preferentially pulled slightly toward the equator of the central body. This creates a torque on the satellite. This torque does not reduce the inclination; rather, it causes a torque-induced gyroscopic precession, which causes the orbital nodes to drift with time.

== Equation ==
The rate of precession depends on the inclination of the orbital plane to the equatorial plane, as well as the orbital eccentricity.

For a satellite in a prograde orbit around Earth, the precession is westward (nodal regression), that is, the node and satellite move in opposite directions. A good approximation of the precession rate is

$$\omega_\mathrm{p} = -\frac32 \frac{{R_\mathrm{E}}^2}{\left(a\left(1-e^2\right)\right)^2} J_2 \omega \cos i$$

where

ω_{p} is the precession rate (in rad/s),
R_{E} is the body's equatorial radius (6378137 m for Earth),
a is the semi-major axis of the satellite's orbit,
e is the eccentricity of the satellite's orbit,
ω is the angular velocity of the satellite's motion (2π radians divided by its period in seconds),
i is its inclination,
J_{2} is the body's second dynamic form factor

The nodal progression of low Earth orbits is typically a few degrees per day to the west (negative). For a satellite in a circular (e = 0) 800 km altitude orbit at 56° inclination about Earth:

$$\begin{align}
R_\mathrm{E} &= 6.378\,137 \times10^{6} \text{ m} \\
J_2 &= 1.082\,626\,68\times10^{-3} \end{align}$$

The orbital period is 6052.4 s, so the angular velocity is 0.001038 rad/s. The precession is therefore

$$\begin{align}
\omega_\mathrm{p} &= -\frac32 \cdot \frac{6\, 378\, 137^2}{\left(7\, 178\, 137\left(1-0^2\right)\right)^2} \cdot \left(1.082\,626\,68\times10^{-3}\right) \cdot 0.001\,038 \cdot \cos 56^\circ \\
&= -7.44\times10^{-7}\text{ rad/s} \end{align}$$

This is equivalent to −3.683° per day, so the orbit plane will make one complete turn (in inertial space) in 98 days.

The apparent motion of the Sun is approximately +1° per day (360° per year / 365.2422 days per tropical year ≈ 0.9856473° per day), so apparent motion of the orbit plane, relative to the Sun, is about -4.7° (westward) per day, resulting in a complete cycle (w.r.t. the Sun) in about 77 days. For retrograde orbits ω is negative, so the precession becomes positive. (Alternatively, ω can be thought of as positive but the inclination is greater than 90°, so the cosine of the inclination is negative.) In this case it is possible to make the precession approximately match the apparent motion of the Sun, resulting in a heliosynchronous orbit.

The $J_2$ used in this equation is the dimensionless coefficient $\tilde{J_2} = -\frac{J_2}{GM_{E}R_{E}^2}$ from the geopotential model or gravity field model for the body.

== Effects ==
The nodal precession has some effects on astronomical events. The most remarkable is that the precession of the lunar nodes allows solar and lunar eclipses in each month of the year. A further effect is that the stars, which can be occulted by the moon, changes as lunar nodes wander. As nodal precession rate is much smaller at planets, the effects are here also much smaller. One effect is that the time when Mercury and Venus transits take place changes slowly. Nodal precession changes also the stars, which can be occulted by a certain planet.

== See also ==
- Axial precession, or "precession of the equinoxes" for Earth
- Apsidal precession, another kind of orbital precession (the change in the argument of periapsis)
- Lunar standstill, in which the Moon's declination on the lunistices depends on the precession of its orbital nodes
- Lunar node
- Sun-synchronous orbits, an important application of nodal precession
