= Ecliptic =

Apparent path of the Sun on the celestial sphere

As seen from the orbiting Earth, the Sun appears to move with respect to the fixed stars, and the ecliptic is the yearly path the Sun follows on the celestial sphere. This process repeats itself in a cycle lasting a little over 365 days.

The ecliptic or ecliptic plane is the apparent path of the Sun on the celestial sphere, resulting from Earth's orbit around the Sun. (Note: Strictly, the plane of the mean orbit, with minor variations averaged out.) It was a central concept in a number of ancient sciences, providing the framework for key measurements in astronomy, astrology and calendar-making. The ecliptic is so named because the ancients noted that eclipses only occur when the Moon is crossing it.

Sun path can be traced against the background of stars, especially the Zodiac constellations. The planets of the Solar System can be seen along the ecliptic because their orbital planes are very close to Earth's. The Moon also appears near the plane, with the Moon's orbital plane inclined only 5.1°, intersecting the ecliptic at the lunar nodes.

The ecliptic is an important reference plane and is the basis of the ecliptic coordinate system. Ancient scientists were able to calculate Earth's axial tilt by comparing the angle of the ecliptic (about 23.4°) to that of the equatorial plane.

== Sun's apparent motion ==
The ecliptic is the apparent path of the Sun throughout the course of a year.

Because Earth takes one year to orbit the Sun, the apparent position of the Sun takes one year to make a complete circuit of the ecliptic. With slightly more than 365 days in one year, the Sun moves a little less than 1° eastward (Note: The directions north and south on the celestial sphere are in the sense toward the north celestial pole and toward the south celestial pole. East is the direction toward which Earth rotates, west is opposite that.) every day. This small difference in the Sun's position against the stars causes any particular spot on Earth's surface to catch up with (and stand directly north or south of) the Sun about four minutes later each day than it would if Earth did not orbit; a day on Earth is therefore 24 hours long rather than the approximately 23-hour 56-minute sidereal day. Again, this is a simplification, based on a hypothetical Earth that orbits at a uniform angular speed around the Sun. The actual speed with which Earth orbits the Sun varies slightly during the year, so the speed with which the Sun seems to move along the ecliptic also varies. For example, the Sun is north of the celestial equator for about 185 days of each year, and south of it for about 180 days. The variation of orbital speed accounts for part of the equation of time.

Because of the movement of Earth around the Earth–Moon center of mass, the apparent path of the Sun wobbles slightly, with a period of about one month. Because of further perturbations by the other planets of the Solar System, the Earth–Moon barycenter wobbles slightly around a mean position in a complex fashion.

== Inclination to the plane of the Solar System ==
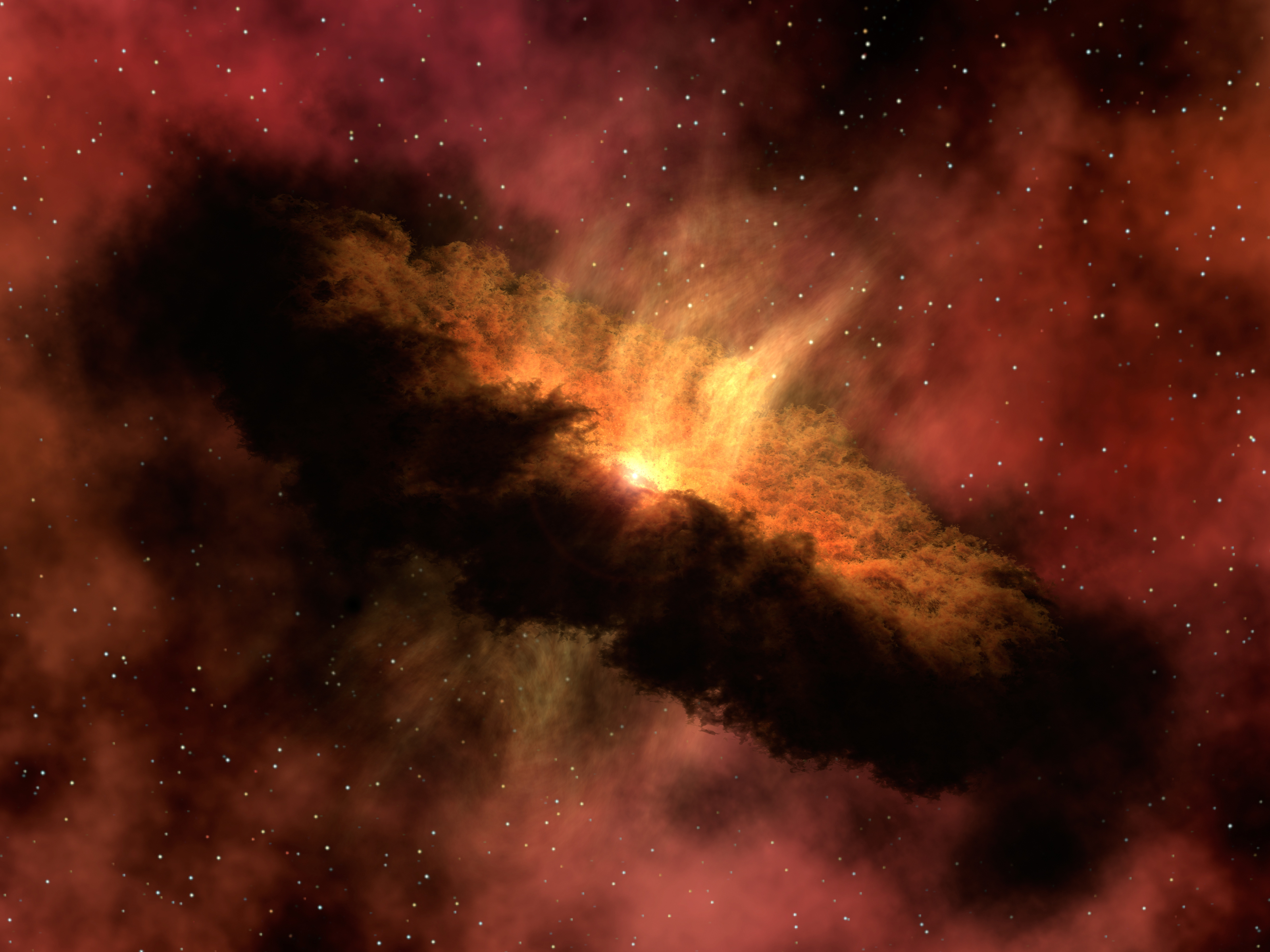
A depiction of the early Solar System's protoplanetary disk from which Earth and other Solar System bodies were formed

Most of the major bodies of the Solar System orbit the Sun in nearly the same plane. This is thought to be due to the planets being formed from a protoplanetary disk, with all the dust and gas orbiting the sun close to a single plane. The invariable plane of the Solar System is the plane passing through its center of mass perpendicular to its angular momentum vector. Earth's orbit, and hence, the ecliptic, is inclined a little more than 1° to the invariable plane, Jupiter's orbit is within a little more than ½° of it, and Mercury, the planet with the highest inclination, lies around 6°. Because of this, most Solar System bodies appear very close to the ecliptic in the sky.

The invariable plane is defined by the angular momentum of the entire Solar System, essentially the vector sum of all of the orbital and rotational angular momenta of all the bodies of the system; more than 60% of the total comes from the orbit of Jupiter. That sum requires precise knowledge of every object in the system, making it a somewhat uncertain value. Because of the uncertainty regarding the exact location of the invariable plane, and because the ecliptic is well defined by the apparent motion of the Sun, the ecliptic is used as the reference plane of the Solar System both for precision and convenience. The only drawback of using the ecliptic instead of the invariable plane is that over geologic time scales, it will move against fixed reference points in the sky's distant background.

Top and side views of the plane of the ecliptic, showing planets Mercury, Venus, Earth, and Mars. Most of the planets orbit the Sun very nearly in the same plane in which Earth orbits, the ecliptic.

Body		Inclination to		
Body		Ecliptic	Sun's equator	Invariable plane
Terre- strials	Mercury	7.01°	3.38°	6.34°
Terre- strials	Venus	3.39°	3.86°	2.19°
Terre- strials	Earth	0°	7.25°	1.57°
Terre- strials	Mars	1.85°	5.65°	1.67°
Gas & ice giants	Jupiter	1.31°	6.09°	0.32°
Gas & ice giants	Saturn	2.49°	5.51°	0.93°
Gas & ice giants	Uranus	0.77°	6.48°	1.02°
Gas & ice giants	Neptune	1.77°	6.43°	0.72°
Minor planets	Pluto	17.14°	11.88°	15.55°
Minor planets	Ceres	10.59°		9.20°
Minor planets	Pallas	34.83°		34.21°
Minor planets	Vesta	5.58°		7.13°

=== Inclination to the galactic plane ===
The ecliptic is inclined to the galactic plane by 60°.

A dark sky view, showing the difference in inclination of the galactic plane of the Milky Way to the not much inclined to each other orbital planes of the Solar System planets incl. the ecliptic, which is illuminated by the outlined zodiacal light and flanked by a meteor shower

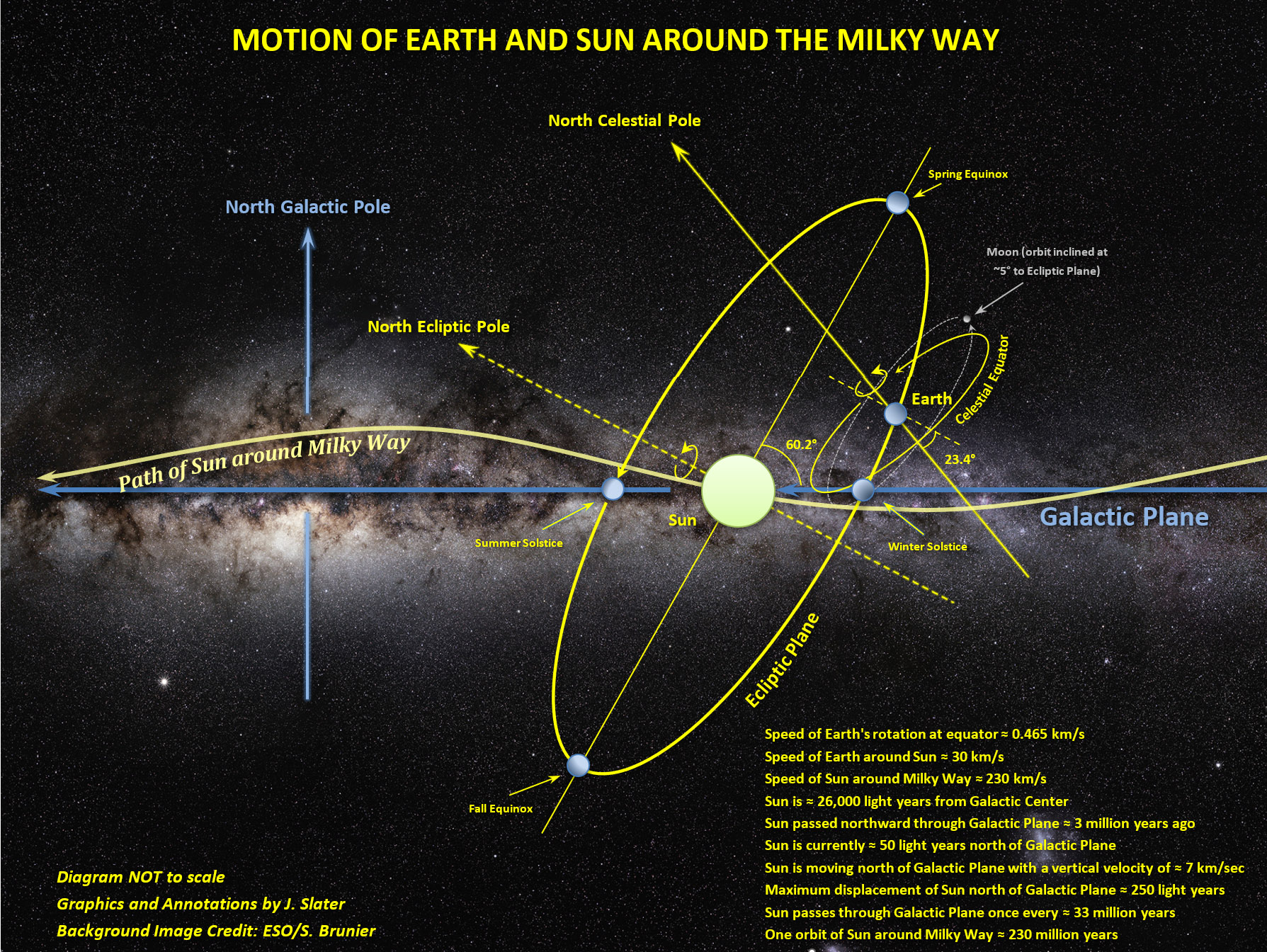
The general motion and orientation of the Sun, with Earth and the Moon as its Solar System satellites

== Referencing Earth's equator ==
The ecliptic plane (gray) projected outward to the celestial sphere. The 23.44° tilt of Earth's axis defines its celestial equator (red). The equinoxes (red dots) occur biannually, when the Sun appears directly above the equator.

Because Earth's rotational axis is not perpendicular to its orbital plane, Earth's equatorial plane is not coplanar with the ecliptic plane, but is inclined to it by an angle of about 23.4°, which is known as the obliquity of the ecliptic. If the equator is projected outward to the celestial sphere, forming the celestial equator, it crosses the ecliptic at two points known as the equinoxes. The Sun, in its apparent motion along the ecliptic, crosses the celestial equator at these points, one from south to north, the other from north to south. The crossing from south to north is known as the March equinox, also known as the first point of Aries and the ascending node of the ecliptic on the celestial equator. The crossing from north to south is the September equinox or descending node.

=== Celestial reference plane ===
The apparent motion of the Sun along the ecliptic (red) as seen on the inside of the celestial sphere. Ecliptic coordinates appear in (red). The celestial equator (blue) and the equatorial coordinates (blue), being inclined to the ecliptic, appear to wobble as the Sun advances.

The ecliptic forms one of the two fundamental planes used as reference for positions on the celestial sphere, the other being the celestial equator. Perpendicular to the ecliptic are the ecliptic poles, the north ecliptic pole being the pole north of the equator. Of the two fundamental planes, the ecliptic is closer to unmoving against the background stars, its motion due to planetary precession being roughly 1/100 that of the celestial equator.

Spherical coordinates, known as ecliptic longitude and latitude or celestial longitude and latitude, are used to specify positions of bodies on the celestial sphere with respect to the ecliptic. Longitude is measured positively eastward 0° to 360° along the ecliptic from the March equinox, the same direction in which the Sun appears to move. Latitude is measured perpendicular to the ecliptic, to +90° northward or −90° southward to the poles of the ecliptic, the ecliptic itself being 0° latitude. For a complete spherical position, a distance parameter is also necessary. Different distance units are used for different objects. Within the Solar System, astronomical units are used, and for objects near Earth, Earth radii or kilometers are used. A corresponding right-handed rectangular coordinate system is also used occasionally; the x-axis is directed toward the March equinox, the y-axis 90° to the east, and the z-axis toward the north ecliptic pole; the astronomical unit is the unit of measure. Symbols for ecliptic coordinates are somewhat standardized; see the table.

Summary of notation for ecliptic coordinates
	Spherical			Rectangular
	Longitude	Latitude	Distance	Rectangular
Geocentric	λ	β	Δ	
Heliocentric	l	b	r	x, y, z (Note: Occasional use; x, y, z are usually reserved for equatorial coordinates.)

Ecliptic coordinates are convenient for specifying positions of Solar System objects, as most of the planets' orbits have small inclinations to the ecliptic, and therefore always appear relatively close to it on the sky. Because Earth's orbit, and hence the ecliptic, moves very little, it is a relatively fixed reference with respect to the stars.

Because of the precessional motion of the equinox, the ecliptic coordinates of objects on the celestial sphere are continuously changing. Specifying a position in ecliptic coordinates requires specifying a particular equinox, that is, the equinox of a particular date, known as an epoch; the coordinates are referred to the direction of the equinox at that date. For instance, the Astronomical Almanac lists the heliocentric position of Mars at 0h Terrestrial Time, 4 January 2010 as: longitude 118°09′15.8″, latitude +1°43′16.7″, true heliocentric distance 1.6302454 AU, mean equinox and ecliptic of date. This specifies the mean equinox of 4 January 2010 0h TT as above, without the addition of nutation.

== Change of inclination ==
The obliquity of the ecliptic of 23.4° is currently decreasing 0.013 degrees (47 arcseconds) per hundred years because of planetary perturbations.

The angular value of the obliquity is found by observation of the motions of Earth and other planets over many years. Astronomers produce new fundamental ephemerides as the accuracy of observation improves and as the understanding of the dynamics increases, and from these ephemerides various astronomical values, including the obliquity, are derived.

Until 1983 the obliquity for any date was calculated from work of Newcomb, who analyzed positions of the planets until about 1895:

ε = 23°27′08.26″ − 46.845″ T − 0.0059″ T^{2} + 0.00181″ T^{3}

where ε is the obliquity and T is tropical centuries from B1900.0 to the date in question.

From 1984, the Jet Propulsion Laboratory's DE series of computer-generated ephemerides took over as the fundamental ephemeris of the Astronomical Almanac. Obliquity based on DE200, which analyzed observations from 1911 to 1979, was calculated:

ε = 23°26′21.45″ − 46.815″ T − 0.0006″ T^{2} + 0.00181″ T^{3}

where hereafter T is Julian centuries from J2000.0.

JPL's fundamental ephemerides have been continually updated. The Astronomical Almanac for 2010 specifies:

ε = 23°26′21.406″ − 46.836769″ T − 0.0001831″ T^{2} + 0.00200340″ T^{3} − 0.576×10^{−6}″ T^{4} − 4.34×10^{−8}″ T^{5}

These expressions for the obliquity are intended for high precision over a relatively short time span, perhaps several centuries. J. Laskar computed an expression to order T^{10} good to 0.04″/1000 years over 10,000 years.

All of these expressions are for the mean obliquity, that is, without the nutation of the equator included. The true or instantaneous obliquity includes the nutation.

=== Precession ===
The ecliptic itself is not fixed. The gravitational perturbations of the other bodies of the Solar System cause a much smaller motion of the plane of Earth's orbit, and hence of the ecliptic, known as planetary precession.

Likewise, the orientation of Earth's axis and equator are not fixed in space, but rotate about the poles of the ecliptic with a period of about 26,000 years, a process known as lunisolar precession or axial precession, as it is due mostly to the gravitational effect of the Moon and Sun on Earth's equatorial bulge.

The combined action of these two motions is called general precession, and changes the position of the equinoxes by about 50 arc seconds (about 0.014°) per year.

=== Nutation ===
Once again, this is a simplification. Periodic motions of the Moon and apparent periodic motions of the Sun (actually of Earth in its orbit) cause short-term small-amplitude periodic oscillations of Earth's axis, and hence the celestial equator, known as nutation. This adds a periodic component to the position of the equinoxes; the positions of the celestial equator and (March) equinox with fully updated precession and nutation are called the true equator and equinox; the positions without nutation are the mean equator and equinox.

== Equinoxes and solstices ==
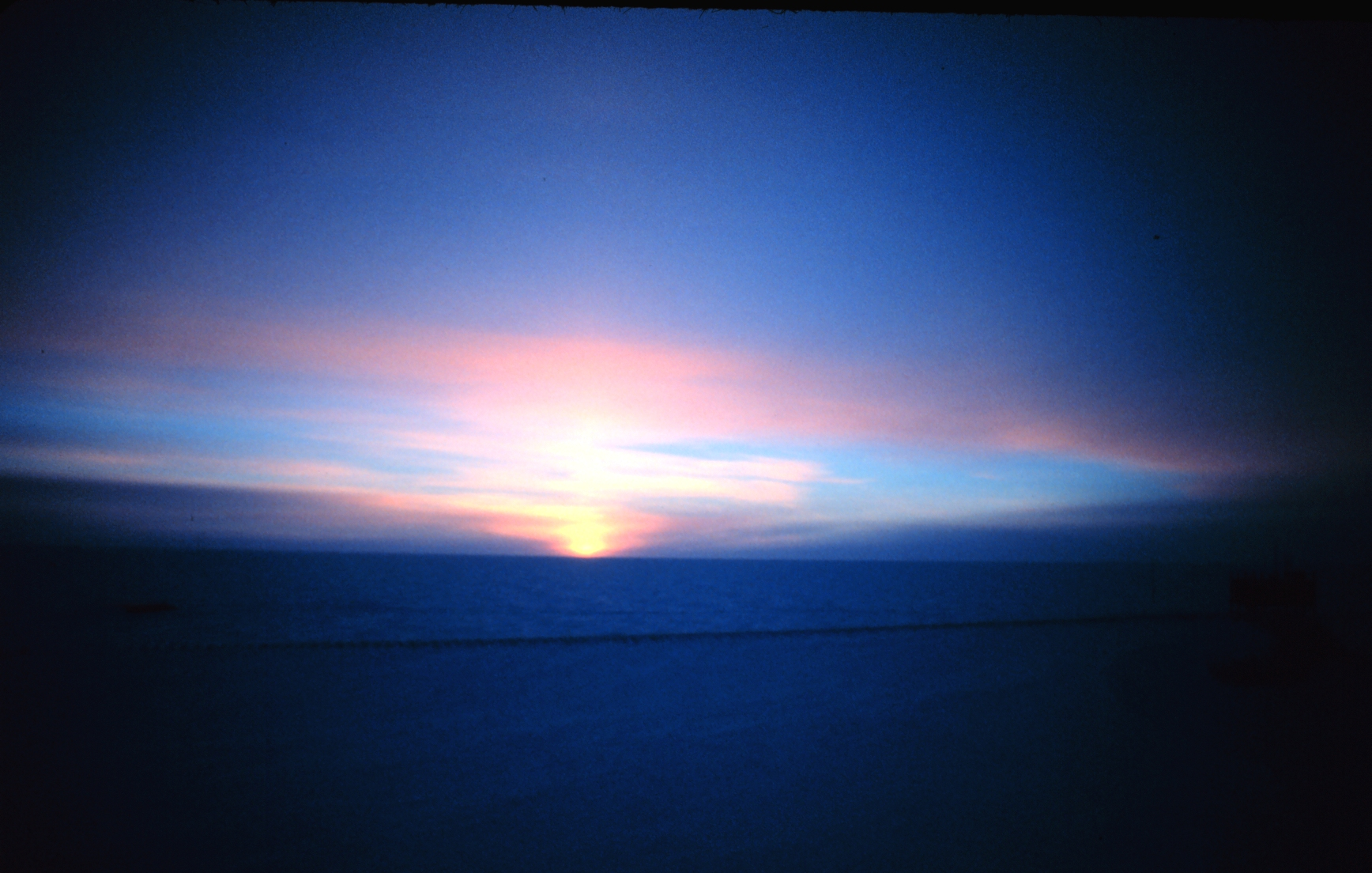
At Earth's poles the Sun appears at the horizon only and all day around equinox, marking the change between the half year long polar night and polar day. The picture shows the South Pole right before March equinox, with the Sun appearing through refraction despite being still below the horizon.

Positions of equinoxes and solstices
	ecliptic	equatorial
	longitude	right ascension
March equinox	0°	0h
June solstice	90°	6h
September equinox	180°	12h
December solstice	270°	18h

The exact instants of equinoxes and solstices are the times when the apparent ecliptic longitude (including the effects of aberration and nutation) of the Sun is 0°, 90°, 180°, and 270°. Because of perturbations of Earth's orbit and anomalies of the calendar, the dates of these are not fixed.

== Eclipses ==
As the Earth revolves around the Sun, approximate axial parallelism of the Moon's orbital plane (tilted five degrees to the ecliptic) results in the revolution of the lunar nodes relative to the Earth. This causes an eclipse season approximately every six months, in which a solar eclipse can occur at the new moon phase and a lunar eclipse can occur at the full moon phase.

Because the orbit of the Moon is inclined only about 5.145° to the ecliptic and the Sun is always very near the ecliptic, eclipses always occur on or near it. Because of the inclination of the Moon's orbit, eclipses do not occur at every conjunction and opposition of the Sun and Moon, but only when the Moon is near an ascending or descending node at the same time it is at conjunction (new) or opposition (full). The ecliptic is so named because the ancients noted that eclipses only occur when the Moon is crossing it.

== In the constellations ==
Equirectangular plot of declination vs right ascension of the modern constellations with a dotted line denoting the ecliptic. Constellations are colour-coded by family and year established.

The ecliptic currently passes through the following thirteen constellations (the zodiac, except Ophiuchus):

- Pisces
- Aries
- Taurus
- Gemini
- Cancer
- Leo
- Virgo
- Libra
- Scorpius
- Ophiuchus
- Sagittarius
- Capricornus
- Aquarius

There are an additional twelve constellations that are not on the ecliptic, but are close enough that the Moon and planets can occasionally appear in some of them.

- Cetus
- Pegasus
- Aquila
- Scutum
- Serpens
- Hydra
- Corvus
- Crater
- Sextans
- Canis Minor
- Auriga
- Orion

Venus is the only planet that occasionally passes through all 25 of these constellations.

== Astrology ==
The ecliptic forms the center of the zodiac, a celestial belt about 20° wide in latitude through which the Sun, Moon, and planets always appear to move. Traditionally, this region is divided into 12 signs of 30° longitude, each of which approximates the Sun's motion in one month. In ancient times, the signs corresponded roughly to 12 of the constellations that straddle the ecliptic. These signs are sometimes still used in modern terminology. The "First Point of Aries" was named when the March equinox Sun was actually in the constellation Aries; it has since moved into Pisces because of precession of the equinoxes.

== See also ==
- Formation and evolution of the Solar System
- Invariable plane
- Protoplanetary disk
- Celestial coordinate system
- Analemma
