= Nautical Almanac (disambiguation) =

The Nautical Almanac is the nautical almanac published by HM Nautical Almanac Office in the United Kingdom.

Nautical Almanac may also refer to:

- Nautical almanac, a publication describing the positions and movements of celestial bodies
- Nautical Almanac (band), an altered-electronics noise music band
- American Ephemeris and Nautical Almanac, which includes the U.S. Nautical Almanac
