= Winlock =

Winlock may refer to:

People

- Anna Winlock (1857–1904), American astronomer and computer
- Fielding Winlock, American politician
- Herbert Eustis Winlock (1884–1950), American archaeologist
- Joseph Winlock (1826–1875), American astronomer and mathematician
- Winlock W. Steiwer (1852–1920), American banker, rancher, and politician

Places

- Winlock, Washington
- Winlock (crater)

== See also ==
- Winlocker - a name for Ransomware
