= Ephemeris =

Table of positions of astronomical objects at given times

In astronomy and celestial navigation, an ephemeris (/ɪˈfɛmərɪs/; pl. ephemerides /ˌɛfəˈmɛrɪˌdiːz/; from Latin ephemeris 'diary', from Ancient Greek ἐφημερίς (ephēmerís) 'diary, journal') is a book with tables that gives the trajectory of naturally occurring astronomical objects and artificial satellites in the sky, i.e., the position (and possibly velocity) over time. Historically, positions were given as printed tables of values, given at regular intervals of date and time. The calculation of these tables was one of the first applications of mechanical computers. Modern ephemerides are often provided in electronic form. However, printed ephemerides are still produced, as they are useful when computational devices are not available.

The astronomical position calculated from an ephemeris is often given in the spherical polar coordinate system of right ascension and declination, together with the distance from the origin if applicable. Some of the astronomical phenomena of interest to astronomers are eclipses, apparent retrograde motion/planetary stations, planetary ingresses, sidereal time, positions for the mean and true nodes of the moon, the phases of the Moon, and the positions of minor celestial bodies such as Chiron.

Ephemerides are used in celestial navigation and astronomy. They are also used by astrologers. GPS signals include ephemeris data used to calculate the position of satellites in orbit.

== History ==
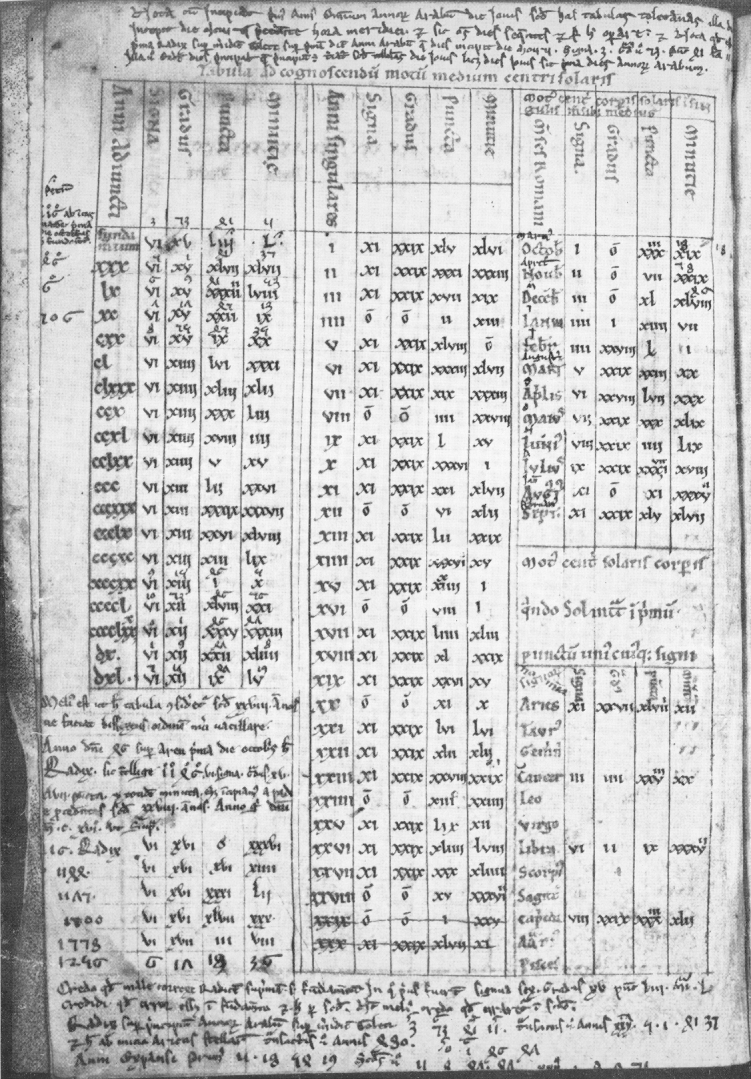
A Latin translation of al-Khwārizmī's zīj, page from Corpus Christi College MS 283

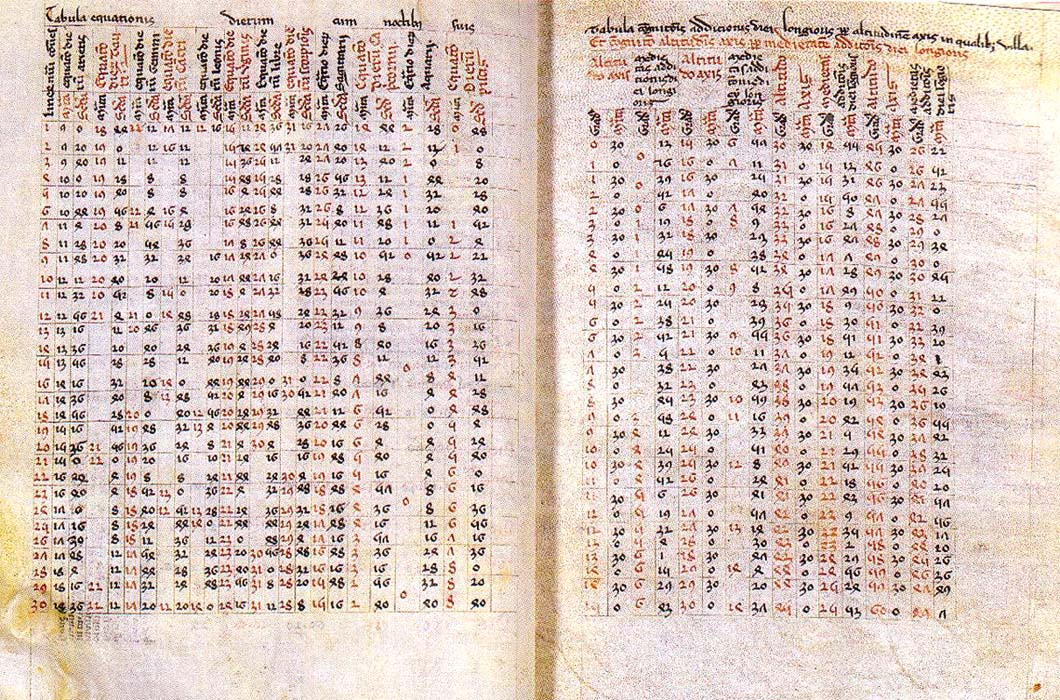
Alfonsine tables

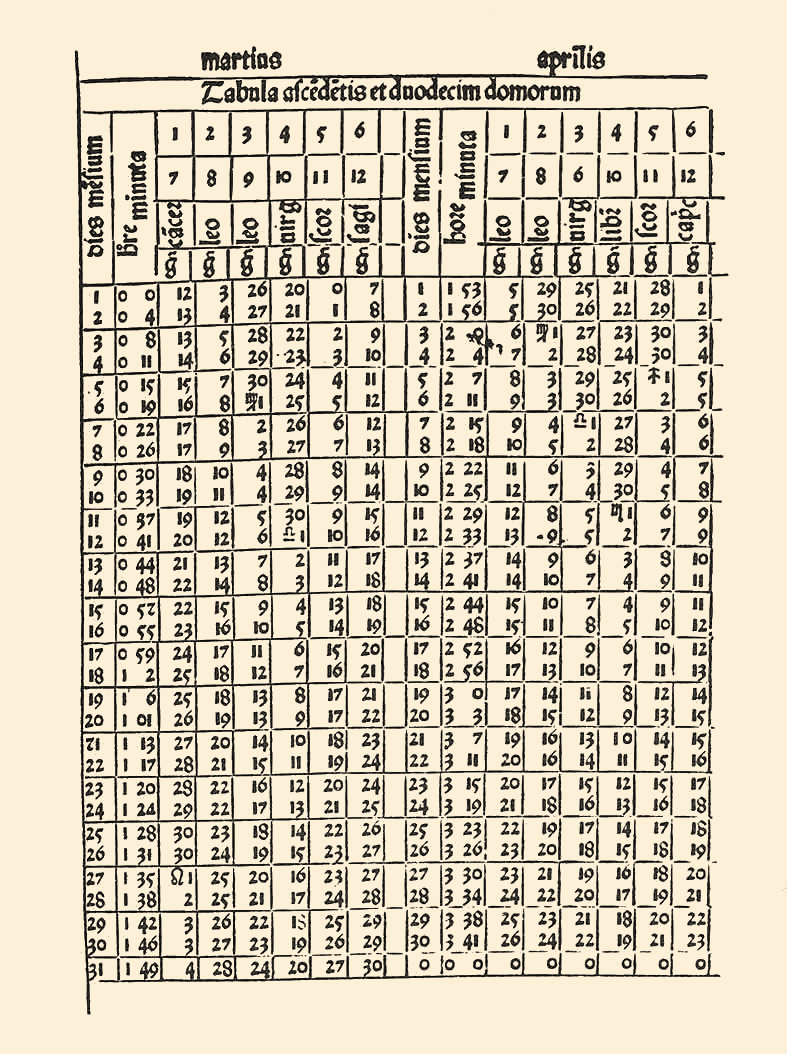
Page from Almanach Perpetuum

- 1st millennium BC – Ephemerides in Babylonian astronomy.
- 2nd century AD – the Almagest and the Handy Tables of Ptolemy
- 8th century AD – the zīj of Ibrāhīm al-Fazārī
- 9th century AD – the zīj of Muḥammad ibn Mūsā al-Khwārizmī
- 11th century AD – the zīj of Ibn Yunus
- 12th century AD – the Tables of Toledo – based largely on Arabic zīj sources of Islamic astronomy – were edited by Gerard of Cremona to form the standard European ephemeris until the Alfonsine Tables.
- 13th century AD – the Zīj-i Īlkhānī (Ilkhanic Tables) were compiled at the Maragheh observatory in Persia.
- 13th century AD – the Alfonsine Tables were compiled in Spain to correct anomalies in the Tables of Toledo, remaining the standard European ephemeris until the Prutenic Tables almost 300 years later.
- 13th century AD - the Dresden Codex, an extant Mayan ephemeris
- 1408 – Chinese ephemeris table (copy in Pepysian Library, Cambridge, UK (refer book '1434'); Chinese tables believed known to Regiomontanus).
- 1474 – Regiomontanus publishes his day-to-day Ephemerides in Nürnberg, Germany.
- 1496 – the Almanach Perpetuum of Abraão ben Samuel Zacuto (one of the first books published with a movable type and printing press in Portugal)
- 1504 – While shipwrecked on the island of Jamaica, Christopher Columbus successfully predicted a lunar eclipse for the natives, using the ephemeris of the German astronomer Regiomontanus.
- 1531 – Work of Johannes Stöffler is published posthumously at Tübingen, extending the ephemeris of Regiomontanus through 1551.
- 1551 – the Prutenic Tables of Erasmus Reinhold were published, based on Copernicus's theories.
- 1554 – Johannes Stadius published Ephemerides novae et auctae, the first major ephemeris computed according to Copernicus' heliocentric model, using parameters derived from the Prutenic Tables. Although the Copernican model provided an elegant solution to the problem of computing apparent planetary positions (it avoided the need for the equant and better explained the apparent retrograde motion of planets), it still relied on the use of epicycles, leading to some inaccuracies – for example, periodic errors in the position of Mercury of up to ten degrees. One of the users of Stadius's tables is Tycho Brahe.
- 1627 – the Rudolphine Tables of Johannes Kepler based on elliptical planetary motion became the new standard.
- 1679 – La Connaissance des Temps ou calendrier et éphémérides du lever & coucher du Soleil, de la Lune & des autres planètes, first published yearly by Jean Picard and still extant.
- 1975 – Owen Gingerich, using modern planetary theory and digital computers, calculates the actual positions of the planets in the 16th century and graphs the errors in the planetary positions predicted by the ephemerides of Stöffler, Stadius and others. According to Gingerich, the error patterns "are as distinctive as fingerprints and reflect the characteristics of the underlying tables. That is, the error patterns for Stöffler are different from those of Stadius, but the error patterns of Stadius closely resemble those of Maestlin, Magini, Origanus, and others who followed the Copernican parameters."

== Modern ephemeris ==
For scientific uses, a modern planetary ephemeris comprises software that generates positions of planets and often of their satellites, asteroids, or comets, at virtually any time desired by the user.

After introduction of electronic computers in the 1950s it became feasible to use numerical integration to compute ephemerides. The Jet Propulsion Laboratory Development Ephemeris is a prime example. Conventional so-called analytical ephemerides that utilize series expansions for the coordinates have also been developed, but of much increased size and accuracy as compared to the past, by making use of computers to manage the tens of thousands of terms. Ephemeride Lunaire Parisienne and VSOP are examples.

Typically, such ephemerides cover several centuries, past and future; the future ones can be covered because the field of celestial mechanics has developed several accurate theories. Nevertheless, there are secular phenomena which cannot adequately be considered by ephemerides. The greatest uncertainties in the positions of planets are caused by the perturbations of numerous asteroids, most of whose masses and orbits are poorly known, rendering their effect uncertain. Reflecting the continuing influx of new data and observations, NASA's Jet Propulsion Laboratory (JPL) has revised its published ephemerides nearly every year since 1981.

Solar System ephemerides are essential for the navigation of spacecraft and for all kinds of space observations of the planets, their natural satellites, stars, and galaxies.

Scientific ephemerides for sky observers mostly contain the positions of celestial bodies in right ascension and declination, because these coordinates are the most frequently used on star maps and telescopes. The equinox of the coordinate system must be given. It is, in nearly all cases, either the actual equinox (the equinox valid for that moment, often referred to as "of date" or "current"), or that of one of the "standard" equinoxes, typically J2000.0, B1950.0, or J1900. Star maps almost always use one of the standard equinoxes.

Scientific ephemerides often contain further useful data about the moon, planet, asteroid, or comet beyond the pure coordinates in the sky, such as elongation to the Sun, brightness, distance, velocity, apparent diameter in the sky, phase angle, times of rise, transit, and set, etc. Ephemerides of the planet Saturn also sometimes contain the apparent inclination of its ring.

Celestial navigation serves as a backup to satellite navigation. Software is widely available to assist with this form of navigation; some of this software has a self-contained ephemeris. When software is used that does not contain an ephemeris, or if no software is used, position data for celestial objects may be obtained from the modern Nautical Almanac or Air Almanac.

An ephemeris is usually only correct for a particular location on the Earth. In many cases, the differences are too small to matter. However, for nearby asteroids or the Moon, they can be quite important.

Other modern ephemerides recently created are the EPM (Ephemerides of Planets and the Moon), from the Russian Institute for Applied Astronomy of the Russian Academy of Sciences, and the INPOP (Intégrateur numérique planétaire de l'Observatoire de Paris) by the French IMCCE.

== See also ==
- Almanac – Annual publication of prospective events
- American Ephemeris and Nautical Almanac – Book of astronomical data for navigation
  - The Astronomical Almanac (new name)
- Ephemera – Transient items but collected nonetheless
- Ephemeris time – Time standard used in astronomical ephemerides
- Epoch (astronomy) – Moment in time used as a reference point in astronomy
- Epoch (reference date) – Reference point from which time is measured
- Fundamental ephemeris – Model of the elements of the solar system
- January 0 and March 0
- Keplerian elements – Concerning the size and shape of an orbit
- Nautical almanac – Publication on celestial body positions
- Osculating orbit – Orbital perturbations
- Ptolemy's table of chords – 2nd century AD trigonometric table
- Two-line element set – Orbital data format
- William of Saint-Cloud – Thirteenth century French astronomer
