= Miers Longstreth =

American astronomer

Miers Fisher Longstreth (March 15, 1819 – December 27, 1891) was an American merchant, physician, and astronomer, best known as a founding member of the National Academy of Sciences.

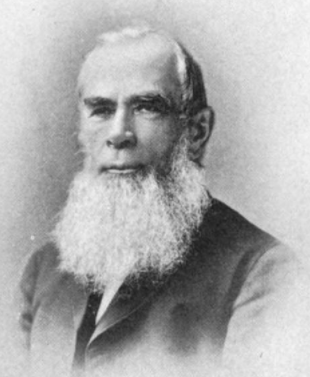
Miers Fisher Longstreth (1819-1891)

Longstreth was born in Philadelphia and received his secondary education at Clermont Academy (graduating 1833), then M.L. Hurlburt's Classical Academy. He left school to work in a hardware store, becoming a full member of the firm in 1840. As early as 1837, however, he was attending lectures at the College of Pharmacy of the University of Pennsylvania. In 1856 he completed a medical degree at the university's Medical Department.

By happenstance, a new Friends School was established next to his and his wife's home. The school had an astronomical observatory, which Dr. Longstreth was invited to use. He soon came to own a 5-inch aperture telescope, a transit instrument, and an astronomical clock. With these instruments, he discovered a discrepancy in the then-accepted formulas for the position of the Moon and improved upon them as "Longstreth's Lunar Formula", so-named by Benjamin Peirce and put to immediate use in the American Nautical Almanac.

Longstreth was elected a member of the American Philosophical Society in 1848, and was a founding member of the National Academy of Sciences in 1863. Throughout his life he was a devoted member of the Society of Friends.
