= Eclipse season =

Period when eclipses can occur

As the Earth revolves around the Sun, approximate axial parallelism of the Moon's orbital plane (tilted five degrees to the Earth's orbital plane) results in the revolution of the lunar nodes relative to the Earth. This causes an eclipse season approximately every six months (173 days), in which a solar eclipse can occur at the new moon phase and a lunar eclipse can occur at the full moon phase.

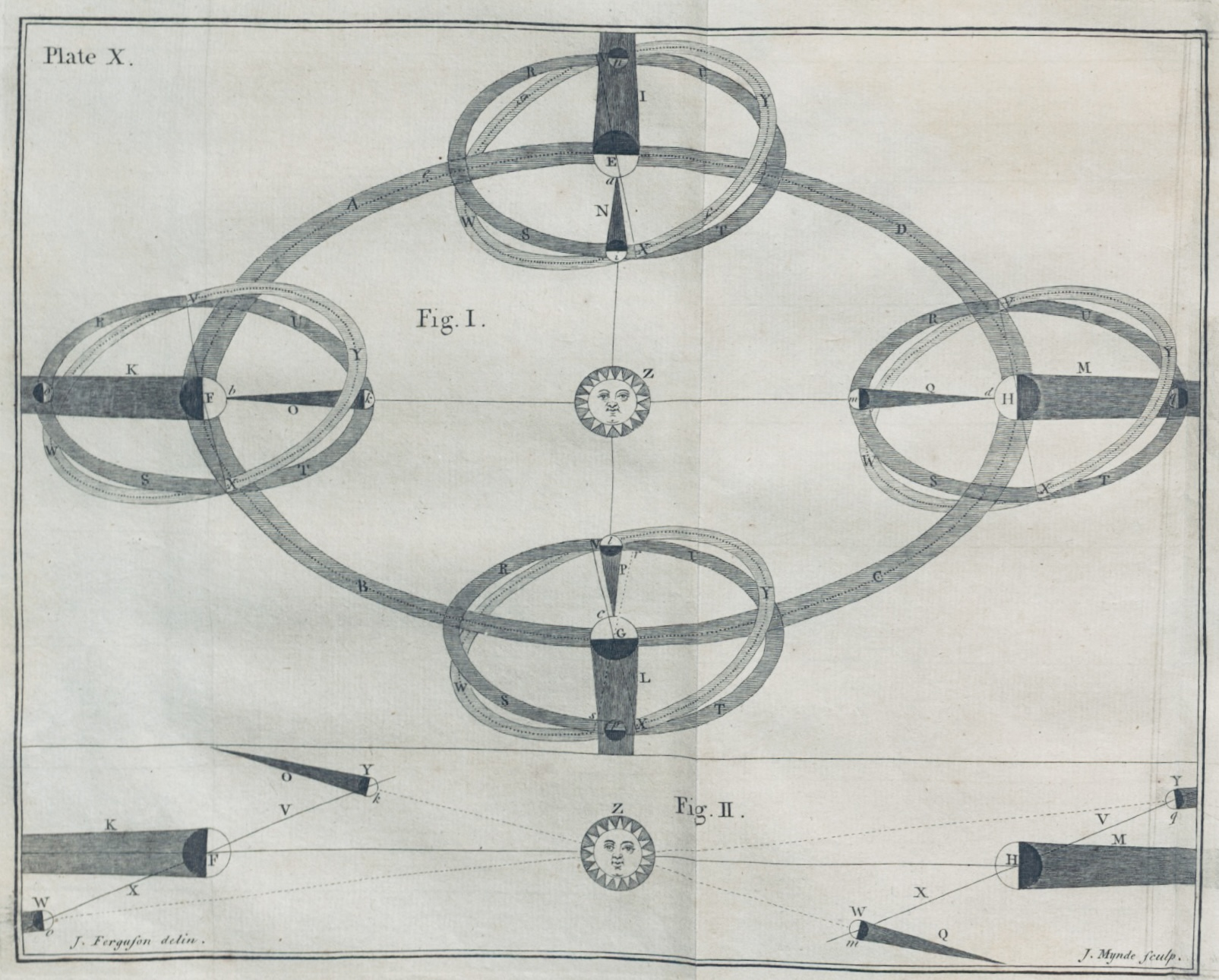
James Ferguson's 1757 comparison of a lunar or solar eclipse with a full or new moon, showing how the nodal precession of the moon's 5° orbital inclination means eclipses happen only about every six months rather than every two weeks

An eclipse season is a period of approximately 1 month, occurring roughly every six months, when the orbits of the Earth, Sun, and Moon align such that solar and lunar eclipses occur. Eclipse seasons are the result of the axial parallelism of the Moon's orbital plane (tilted five degrees to the Earth's orbital plane), just as Earth's weather seasons are the result of the axial parallelism of Earth's tilted axis as it orbits around the Sun. During the season, the "lunar nodes" – the line where the Moon's orbital plane intersects with the Earth's orbital plane – align with the Sun and Earth, such that a solar eclipse is formed during the new moon phase and a lunar eclipse is formed during the full moon phase.

Only two (or occasionally three) eclipse seasons occur during each year, and each season lasts about 35 days and repeats just short of six months (173 days) later, thus two full eclipse seasons always occur each year. Either two or three eclipses happen each eclipse season. During the eclipse season, the Moon is at a low ecliptic latitude (less than around 1.5° north or south), hence the Sun, Moon, and Earth become aligned straightly enough (in syzygy) for an eclipse to occur. Eclipse seasons should occur 38 times within a saros period (6,585.3 days).

The type of each solar eclipse (whether total or annular, as seen from the sublunar point) depends on the apparent sizes of the Sun and Moon, which are functions of the distances of Earth from the Sun and of the Moon from Earth, respectively, as seen from Earth's surface. These distances vary because both the Earth and the Moon have elliptic orbits.

If both orbits were coplanar (i.e. on the same plane) with each other, then two eclipses would happen every lunar month (29.53 days), assuming the Earth had a perfectly circular orbit centered around the Sun, and the Moon's orbit was also perfectly circular and centered around the Earth. A lunar eclipse would occur at every full moon, a solar eclipse every new moon, and all solar eclipses would be the same type.

== Details ==
Speaking from a terrestrial perspective, an eclipse season is the only time when the Sun is close enough to one of the Moon's nodes to allow an eclipse to occur. During the season, whenever there is a full moon a lunar eclipse may occur and whenever there is a new moon a solar eclipse may occur. If the Sun is close enough to a node, then a "full" eclipse [total or annular solar, or total lunar] will occur. Each season lasts from 31 to 37 days, and seasons recur about every 6 months (173 days). At least two (one solar and one lunar, in any order), and at most three eclipses (solar, lunar, then solar again, or vice versa), will occur during every eclipse season. This is because it is about 15 days (a fortnight) between a full moon and a new moon and vice versa. If there is an eclipse at the very beginning of the season, then there is enough time (30 days) for two more eclipses.

In other words, because the eclipse season (34 days long on average) is longer than the synodic month (one lunation, or the time for the Moon to return to a particular phase and about 29.5 days), the Moon will be new or full at least two, and up to three, times during the season. Eclipse seasons occur slightly shy of six months apart (successively occurring every 173.31 days - half of an eclipse year), the time it takes the Sun to travel from one node to the next along the ecliptic. If the last eclipse of an eclipse season occurs at the very beginning of a calendar year, a total of seven eclipses may occur that year because there is still time before the end of the year for two full eclipse seasons, each having up to three eclipses.

== Examples: Part 1 out of 4 ==
=== Visual sequence of two particular eclipse seasons ===
In each sequence below, each eclipse is separated by a fortnight. The first and last eclipse in each sequence is separated by one synodic month. See also Eclipse cycles.

Eclipse season of June–July 2020
June 5 Descending node (full moon)	June 21 Ascending node (new moon)	July 5 Descending node (full moon)
Penumbral lunar eclipse Lunar saros 111	Annular solar eclipse Solar saros 137	Penumbral lunar eclipse Lunar saros 149

Eclipse season of June–July 2029
June 12 Descending node (new moon)	June 26 Ascending node (full moon)	July 11 Descending node (new moon)
Partial solar eclipse Solar saros 118	Total lunar eclipse Lunar saros 130	Partial solar eclipse Solar saros 156

(The two eclipse seasons above share similarities (lunar or solar centrality and gamma of each eclipse in the same column) because they are a half saros apart.)

=== Chart of eclipse seasons ===
Date	Type (phase)	Time of season	Saros series	next eclipse will occur...
January 31, 1999	lunar (full)	beginning	Lunar saros 114 (58 of 71)	next new moon
February 16, 1999	solar (new)	end	Solar saros 140 (28 of 71)	next eclipse season
... no eclipses for about 5 and a half months...
July 28, 1999	lunar (full)	beginning	Lunar saros 119 (60 of 82)	next new moon
August 11, 1999	solar (new)	end	Solar saros 145 (21 of 77)	next eclipse season
... no eclipses for about 5 and a half months...
January 21, 2000	lunar (full)	beginning	Lunar saros 124 (48 of 73)	next new moon
February 5, 2000	solar (new)	end	Solar saros 150 (16 of 71)	next eclipse season
... no eclipses for about 5 months...
July 1, 2000	solar (new)	beginning	Solar saros 117 (68 of 71)	next full moon
July 16, 2000	lunar (full)	middle	Lunar saros 129 (37 of 71)	next new moon
July 31, 2000	solar (new)	end	Solar saros 155 (5 of 71)	next eclipse season
... no eclipses for about 5 months...
December 25, 2000	solar (new)	beginning	Solar saros 122 (57 of 70)	next full moon
January 9, 2001	lunar (full)	end	Lunar saros 134 (26 of 72)	next eclipse season
... no eclipses for about 5 and a half months...
June 21, 2001	solar (new)	beginning	Solar saros 127 (57 of 82)	next full moon
July 5, 2001	lunar (full)	end	Lunar saros 139 (20 of 79)	next eclipse season
... no eclipses for about 5 and a half months...
December 14, 2001	solar (new)	beginning	Solar saros 132 (45 of 71)	next full moon
December 30, 2001	lunar (full)	end	Lunar saros 144 (15 of 71)	next eclipse season
... no eclipses for about 5 months...
May 26, 2002	lunar (full)	beginning	Lunar saros 111 (66 of 71)	next new moon
June 10, 2002	solar (new)	middle	Solar saros 137 (35 of 70)	next full moon
June 24, 2002	lunar (full)	end	Lunar saros 149 (2 of 71)	next eclipse season
... no eclipses for about 5 months...
November 19-20, 2002	lunar (full)	beginning	Lunar saros 116 (57 of 73)	next new moon
December 4, 2002	solar (new)	end	Solar saros 142 (22 of 72)	next eclipse season
... no eclipses for about 5 and a half months...
May 16, 2003	lunar (full)	beginning	Lunar saros 121 (54 of 82)	next new moon
May 31, 2003	solar (new)	end	Solar saros 147 (22 of 80)	next eclipse season
... no eclipses for about 5 and a half months...
November 8-9, 2003	lunar (full)	beginning	Lunar saros 126 (44 of 70)	next new moon
November 23, 2003	solar (new)	end	Solar saros 152 (12 of 70)	next eclipse season
... no eclipses for about 5 months...
April 19, 2004	solar (new)	beginning	Solar saros 119 (65 of 71)	next full moon
May 4, 2004	lunar (full)	end	Lunar saros 131 (33 of 72)	next eclipse season
... no eclipses for about 5 and a half months...
October 14, 2004	solar (new)	beginning	Solar saros 124 (54 of 73)	next full moon
October 28, 2004	lunar (full)	end	Lunar saros 136 (19 of 72)	next eclipse season
... no eclipses for about 5 and a half months...
April 8, 2005	solar (new)	beginning	Solar saros 129 (51 of 80)	next full moon
April 24, 2005	lunar (full)	end	Lunar saros 141 (23 of 72)	next eclipse season
... no eclipses for about 5 and a half months...
October 3, 2005	solar (new)	beginning	Solar saros 134 (43 of 71)	next full moon
October 17, 2005	lunar (full)	end	Lunar saros 146 (10 of 72)	next eclipse season
... no eclipses for about 5 months...
March 14, 2006	lunar (full)	beginning	Lunar saros 113 (63 of 71)	next new moon
March 29, 2006	solar (new)	end	Solar saros 139 (29 of 71)	next eclipse season
... no eclipses for about 5 and a half months...
September 7, 2006	lunar (full)	beginning	Lunar saros 118 (51 of 73)	next new moon
September 22, 2006	solar (new)	end	Solar saros 144 (16 of 70)	next eclipse season
... no eclipses for about 5 and a half months...
March 3, 2007	lunar (full)	beginning	Lunar saros 123 (52 of 72)	next new moon
March 19, 2007	solar (new)	end	Solar saros 149 (20 of 71)	next eclipse season
... no eclipses for about 5 and a half months...
August 28, 2007	lunar (full)	beginning	Lunar saros 128 (40 of 71)	next new moon
September 11, 2007	solar (new)	end	Solar saros 154 (6 of 71)	next eclipse season
... no eclipses for about 5 months...
February 7, 2008	solar (new)	beginning	Solar saros 121 (60 of 71)	next full moon
February 21, 2008	lunar (full)	end	Lunar saros 133 (26 of 71)	next eclipse season
... no eclipses for about 5 and a half months...
August 1, 2008	solar (new)	beginning	Solar saros 126 (47 of 72)	next full moon
August 16, 2008	lunar (full)	end	Lunar saros 138 (28 of 82)	next eclipse season
... no eclipses for about 5 and a half months...
January 26, 2009	solar (new)	beginning	Solar saros 131 (50 of 70)	next full moon
February 9, 2009	lunar (full)	end	Lunar saros 143 (17 of 72)	next eclipse season
... no eclipses for about 5 months...
July 7, 2009	lunar (full)	beginning	Lunar saros 110 (71 of 72)	next new moon
July 21-22, 2009	solar (new)	middle	Solar saros 136 (37 of 71)	next full moon
August 6, 2009	lunar (full)	end	Lunar saros 148 (3 of 70)	next eclipse season
... no eclipses for about 5 months...
December 31, 2009	lunar (full)	beginning	Lunar saros 115 (57 of 72)	next new moon
January 15, 2010	solar (new)	end	Solar saros 141 (23 of 70)	next eclipse season
... no eclipses for about 5 and a half months...
June 26, 2010	lunar (full)	beginning	Lunar saros 120 (57 of 83)	next new moon
July 11, 2010	solar (new)	end	Solar saros 146 (27 of 76)	next eclipse season
... no eclipses for about 5 and a half months...
December 21, 2010	lunar (full)	beginning	Lunar saros 125 (48 of 72)	next new moon
January 4, 2011	solar (new)	end	Solar saros 151 (14 of 72)	next eclipse season
... no eclipses for about 5 months...
June 1, 2011	solar (new)	beginning	Solar saros 118 (68 of 72)	next full moon
June 15, 2011	lunar (full)	middle	Lunar saros 130 (34 of 71)	next new moon
July 1, 2011	solar (new)	end	Solar saros 156 (1 of 69)	next eclipse season
... no eclipses for about 5 months...
November 25, 2011	solar (new)	beginning	Solar saros 123 (53 of 70)	next full moon
December 10, 2011	lunar (full)	end	Lunar saros 135 (23 of 71)	next eclipse season
... no eclipses for about 5 and a half months...
May 20, 2012	solar (new)	beginning	Solar saros 128 (58 of 73)	next full moon
June 4, 2012	lunar (full)	end	Lunar saros 140 (24 of 77)	next eclipse season
... no eclipses for about 5 and a half months...
November 13, 2012	solar (new)	beginning	Solar saros 133 (45 of 72)	next full moon
November 28, 2012	lunar (full)	end	Lunar saros 145 (11 of 71)	next eclipse season
... no eclipses for about 5 months...
April 25, 2013	lunar (full)	beginning	Lunar saros 112 (65 of 72)	next new moon
May 9-10, 2013	solar (new)	middle	Solar saros 138 (31 of 70)	next full moon
May 25, 2013	lunar (full)	end	Lunar saros 150 (1 of 71)	next eclipse season
... no eclipses for about 5 months...
October 18, 2013	lunar (full)	beginning	Lunar saros 117 (52 of 71)	next new moon
November 3, 2013	solar (new)	end	Solar saros 143 (23 of 72)	next eclipse season
... no eclipses for about 5 and a half months...
April 15, 2014	lunar (full)	beginning	Lunar saros 122 (56 of 74)	next new moon
April 29, 2014	solar (new)	end	Solar saros 148 (21 of 75)	next eclipse season
... no eclipses for about 5 and a half months...
October 8, 2014	lunar (full)	beginning	Lunar saros 127 (42 of 72)	next new moon
October 23, 2014	solar (new)	end	Solar saros 153 (9 of 70)	next eclipse season
... no eclipses for about 5 months...
March 20, 2015	solar (new)	beginning	Solar saros 120 (61 of 71)	next full moon
April 4, 2015	lunar (full)	end	Lunar saros 132 (30 of 71)	next eclipse season
... no eclipses for about 5 and a half months...
September 13, 2015	solar (new)	beginning	Solar saros 125 (54 of 73)	next full moon
September 28, 2015	lunar (full)	end	Lunar saros 137 (26 of 78)	next eclipse season
... no eclipses for about 5 and a half months...
March 8-9, 2016	solar (new)	beginning	Solar saros 130 (52 of 73)	next full moon
March 23, 2016	lunar (full)	end	Lunar saros 142 (18 of 73)	next eclipse season
... no eclipses for about 5 and a half months...
September 1, 2016	solar (new)	beginning	Solar saros 135 (39 of 71)	next full moon
September 16, 2016	lunar (full)	end	Lunar saros 147 (8 of 70)	next eclipse season
... no eclipses for about 5 months...
February 10-11, 2017	lunar (full)	beginning	Lunar saros 114 (59 of 71)	next new moon
February 26, 2017	solar (new)	end	Solar saros 140 (29 of 71)	next eclipse season
... no eclipses for about 5 and a half months...
August 7, 2017	lunar (full)	beginning	Lunar saros 119 (61 of 82)	next new moon
August 21, 2017	solar (new)	end	Solar saros 145 (22 of 77)	next eclipse season
... no eclipses for about 5 and a half months...
January 31, 2018	lunar (full)	beginning	Lunar saros 124 (49 of 73)	next new moon
February 15, 2018	solar (new)	end	Solar saros 150 (17 of 71)	next eclipse season
... no eclipses for about 5 months...
July 13, 2018	solar (new)	beginning	Solar saros 117 (69 of 71)	next full moon
July 27, 2018	lunar (full)	middle	Lunar saros 129 (38 of 71)	next new moon
August 11, 2018	solar (new)	end	Solar saros 155 (6 of 71)	next eclipse season
... no eclipses for about 5 months...
January 5-6, 2019	solar (new)	beginning	Solar saros 122 (58 of 70)	next full moon
January 21, 2019	lunar (full)	end	Lunar saros 134 (27 of 72)	next eclipse season
... no eclipses for about 5 and a half months...
July 2, 2019	solar (new)	beginning	Solar saros 127 (58 of 82)	next full moon
July 16, 2019	lunar (full)	end	Lunar saros 139 (21 of 79)	next eclipse season
... no eclipses for about 5 and a half months...
December 26, 2019	solar (new)	beginning	Solar saros 132 (46 of 71)	next full moon
January 10, 2020	lunar (full)	end	Lunar saros 144 (16 of 71)	next eclipse season
... no eclipses for about 5 months...
June 5, 2020	lunar (full)	beginning	Lunar saros 111 (67 of 71)	next new moon
June 21, 2020	solar (new)	middle	Solar saros 137 (36 of 70)	next full moon
July 5, 2020	lunar (full)	end	Lunar saros 149 (3 of 71)	next eclipse season
... no eclipses for about 5 months...
November 30, 2020	lunar (full)	beginning	Lunar saros 116 (58 of 73)	next new moon
December 14, 2020	solar (new)	end	Solar saros 142 (23 of 72)	next eclipse season

== Examples: Part 2 out of 4 ==
=== Visual sequence of two particular eclipse seasons ===
In each sequence below, each eclipse is separated by a fortnight. The first and last eclipse in each sequence is separated by one synodic month. See also Eclipse cycles.

Eclipse season of July–August 2009
July 7th Ascending node (full moon)	July 22nd Descending node (new moon)	August 6th Ascending node (full moon)
Penumbral lunar eclipse Lunar saros 110	Total solar eclipse Solar saros 136	Penumbral lunar eclipse Lunar saros 148

Eclipse season of July–August 2018
July 13th Ascending node (new moon)	July 27th Descending node (full moon)	August 11th Ascending node (new moon)
Partial solar eclipse Solar saros 117	Total lunar eclipse Lunar saros 129	Partial solar eclipse Solar saros 155

(The two eclipse seasons above share similarities (lunar or solar centrality and gamma of each eclipse in the same column) because they are a half saros apart.)

== Examples: Part 3 out of 4 ==
=== Visual sequence of two particular eclipse seasons ===
In each sequence below, each eclipse is separated by a fortnight. The first and last eclipse in each sequence is separated by one synodic month. See also Eclipse cycles.

Eclipse season of July–August 1944
July 6th Descending node (full moon)	July 20th Ascending node (new moon)	August 4th Descending node (full moon)
Penumbral lunar eclipse Lunar saros 109	Annular solar eclipse Solar saros 135	Penumbral lunar eclipse Lunar saros 147

Eclipse season of July–August 1953
July 11th Descending node (new moon)	July 26th Ascending node (full moon)	August 9th Descending node (new moon)
Partial solar eclipse Solar saros 116	Total lunar eclipse Lunar saros 128	Partial solar eclipse Solar saros 154

(The two eclipse seasons above share similarities (lunar or solar centrality and gamma of each eclipse in the same column) because they are a half saros apart.)

== Examples: Part 4 out of 4 ==
=== Visual sequence of two particular eclipse seasons ===
In each sequence below, each eclipse is separated by a fortnight. The first and last eclipse in each sequence is separated by one synodic month. See also Eclipse cycles.

Eclipse season of July–August 1906
July 21st Ascending node (new moon)	August 4th Descending node (full moon)	August 20th Ascending node (new moon)
Partial solar eclipse Solar saros 115	Total lunar eclipse Lunar saros 127	Partial solar eclipse Solar saros 153

Eclipse season of July–August 1915
July 26th Ascending node (full moon)	August 10th Descending node (new moon)	August 24th Ascending node (full moon)
Penumbral lunar eclipse Lunar saros 108	Annular solar eclipse Solar saros 134	Penumbral lunar eclipse Lunar saros 146

(The two eclipse seasons above share similarities (lunar or solar centrality and gamma of each eclipse in the same column) because they are a half saros apart.)

== See also ==
- Eclipse cycle
- Ecliptic
- Lunar node
- Lunar phase
- Orbit of the Moon
- Orbital inclination
- Syzygy
