= Fundamental ephemeris =

Model of the elements of the solar system

A fundamental ephemeris of the Solar System is a model of the objects of the system in space, with all of their positions and motions accurately represented. It is intended to be a high-precision primary reference for prediction and observation of those positions and motions, and which provides a basis for further refinement of the model. It is generally not intended to cover the entire life of the Solar System; usually a short-duration time span, perhaps a few centuries, is represented to high accuracy. Some long ephemerides cover several millennia to medium accuracy.

They are published by the Jet Propulsion Laboratory as Development Ephemeris. The latest releases include DE430 which covers planetary and lunar ephemeris from Dec 21, 1549 to Jan 25, 2650 with high precision and is intended for general use for modern time periods . DE431 was created to cover a longer time period Aug 15, -13200 to March 15, 17191 with slightly less precision for use with historic observations and far reaching forecasted positions. DE432 was released as a minor update to DE430 with improvements to the Pluto barycenter in support of the New Horizons mission.

== Description ==
The set of physical laws and numerical constants used in the calculation of the ephemeris must be self-consistent and precisely specified. The ephemeris must be calculated strictly in accordance with this set, which represents the most current knowledge of all relevant physical forces and effects. Current fundamental ephemerides are typically released with exact descriptions of all mathematical models, methods of computation, observational data, and adjustment to the observations at the time of their announcement. This may not have been the case in the past, as fundamental ephemerides were then computed from a collection of methods derived over a span of decades by many researchers.

The independent variable of the ephemeris is always time. In the case of the most current ephemerides, it is a relativistic coordinate time scale equivalent to the IAU definition of TCB. In the past, mean solar time (before the discovery of the non-uniform rotation of the Earth) and ephemeris time (before the implementation of relativistic gravitational equations) were used. The remainder of the ephemeris can consist of either the mathematical equations and initial conditions which describe the motions of the bodies of the Solar System, of tabulated data calculated from those equations and conditions, or of condensed mathematical representations of the tabulated data.

A fundamental ephemeris is the basis from which apparent ephemerides, phenomena, and orbital elements are computed for astronomical, nautical, and surveyors' almanacs. Apparent ephemerides give positions and motions of Solar System bodies as seen by observers from the surface of Earth, and are useful for astronomers, navigators, and surveyors in planning observations and in reducing the data acquired, although much of the work of latter two has been supplanted by GPS technology. Phenomena are events related to the configurations of Solar System bodies, for instance rise and set times, phases, eclipses and occultations, and have many civil and scientific applications. Orbital elements are descriptions of the motion of a body at a particular instant, used for further short-time-span calculation of the body's position when high accuracy is not required.

== History ==
Astronomers have been tasked with computing accurate ephemerides, originally for purposes of sea navigation, from at least the 18th century. In England, Charles II founded the Royal Observatory in 1675, which began publishing The Nautical Almanac in 1766. In France, the Bureau des Longitudes was founded in 1795 to publish the Connaissance des Temps. The early fundamental ephemerides of these publications came from many different sources and authors as the science of celestial mechanics matured.

At the end of the 19th century, the analytical methods of general perturbations reached the probable limits of what could be accomplished by hand calculation. The planetary "theories" of Newcomb and Hill formed the fundamental ephemerides of the Nautical Almanac at that time. For the Sun, Mercury, Venus, and Mars, the tabulations of the Astronomical Almanac continued to be derived from the work of Newcomb and Ross through 1983. In France, the works of LeVerrier and Gaillot formed the fundamental ephemeris of the Connaissance des Temps.

From the mid 20th century, work began on numerical integration of the equations of motion on early computing machines for purposes of producing fundamental ephemerides for the Astronomical Almanac. Jupiter, Saturn, Uranus, Neptune, and Pluto were based on the work of Eckert, et al. and Clemence through 1983. The fundamental ephemeris of the Moon, always a difficult problem in celestial mechanics, remained a work-in-progress through the early 1980s. It was based originally on the work of Brown, with updates and corrections by Clemence, et al. and Eckert, et al.

Starting in 1984, a revolution in the methods of producing fundamental ephemerides began. From 1984 through 2002, the fundamental ephemeris of the Astronomical Almanac was the Jet Propulsion Laboratory's DE200/LE200, a fully numerically-integrated ephemeris fitted to modern position and velocity observations of the Sun, Moon, and planets. From 2003 onward (as of Feb 2012), JPL's DE405/LE405, an integrated ephemeris referred to the International Celestial Reference Frame, has been used. In France, the Bureau des Longitudes began using their machine-generated semi-analytical theory VSOP82 in 1984, and their work continued with the founding of the Institut de mécanique céleste et de calcul des éphémérides in 1998 and the INPOP series of numerical ephemerides. DE405/LE405 were superseded by DE421/LE421 in 2008.

== See also ==
- American Ephemeris and Nautical Almanac
- Astronomical Almanac
- Jet Propulsion Laboratory Development Ephemeris
- Newcomb's Tables of the Sun
- The Nautical Almanac

== Sources ==
- Nautical Almanac Office, U.S. Naval Observatory and H.M. Nautical Almanac Office, Royal Greenwich Observatory, Explanatory Supplement to the Astronomical Ephemeris and the American Ephemeris and Nautical Almanac. London: Her Majesty's Stationery Office, 1961 (reprint 1974)
- Nautical Almanac Office, U.S. Naval Observatory and H.M. Nautical Almanac Office, Royal Greenwich Observatory, P.K. Seidelmann, editor, Explanatory Supplement to the Astronomical Almanac. Mill Valley, California: University Science Books, 1992 (reprint 2005)
