= Jean Le Fèvre (astronomer) =

French astronomer and physicist

Jean Le Fèvre (9 April 1652 – 1706, Paris) was a French astronomer and physicist. He was editor of the Connaissance des Temps and was elected to the French Academy of Sciences based on this work.
