= William of Saint-Cloud =

Thirteenth century French astronomer

William of Saint-Cloud was a French astronomer in the late thirteenth century. He is known for his Almanac prepared around 1292, dedicated to Marie of Brabant, and translated for Joan of Navarre. This almanac, one of the rare witness of astronomical observations at the end of the High Middle Ages, contains ephemeris of the sun, moon and planets and advocates also the use of the camera obscura to observe solar eclipses.
