= Connaissance des Temps =

Periodical literature

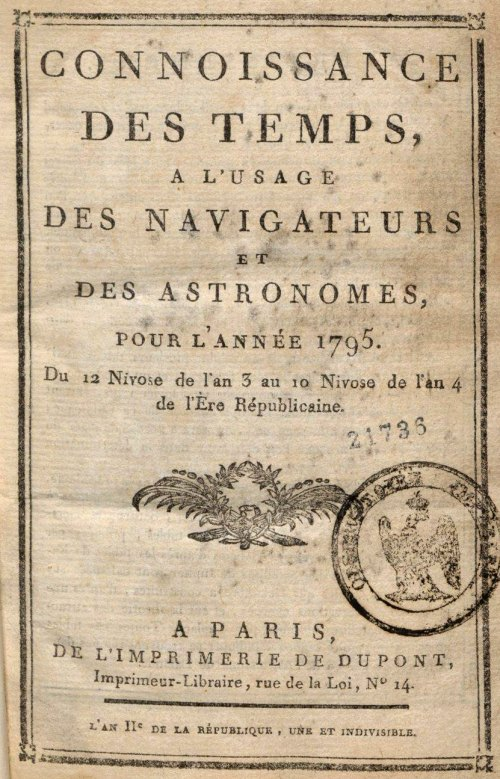
Connaissance des Temps (1795)

The Connaissance des temps (English: Knowledge of the Times) is an official yearly publication of astronomical ephemerides in France. Until just after the French Revolution, the title appeared as Connoissance des temps, and for several years afterwards also as Connaissance des tems.

== History ==
Connaissance des temps is the oldest such publication in the world, published without interruption since 1679 (originally named La Connoissance des Temps ou calendrier et éphémérides du lever & coucher du Soleil, de la Lune & des autres planètes), when the astronomer Jean Picard (1620–1682) obtained from the King the right to create the annual publication. The first eight editors were:

- 1679–1684: Jean Picard (1620–1682)
- 1685–1701: Jean Le Fèvre (1650–1706)
- 1702–1729: Jacques Lieutaud (1660–1733)
- 1730–1734: Louis Godin (1704–1760)
- 1735–1759: Giovanni Domenico Maraldi (1709–1788)
- 1760–1775: Joseph Jérôme Lefrançois de Lalande (1732–1807)
- 1776–1787: Edme-Sébastien Jeaurat (1725–1803)
- 1788–1794: Pierre Méchain (1744–1804)

Other notable astronomers who edited the Connaissance des temps were:

- Alexis Bouvard (1767–1843)
- Bureau des Longitudes
  - Rodolphe Radau (1835–1911)
  - Marie Henri Andoyer (1862–1929)

Among the other prestigious national astronomical ephemerides, The Nautical Almanac was established in Great Britain in 1767, and the Berliner Astronomisches Jahrbuch in 1776.

== Contents ==
The volumes of the Connaissance des temps had two parts:

- a section of ephemerides, containing various tables
- articles giving a deeper coverage of various topics, often written by famous astronomers
