= Joseph Winlock =

American astronomer and mathematician

Joseph Winlock FAAAS
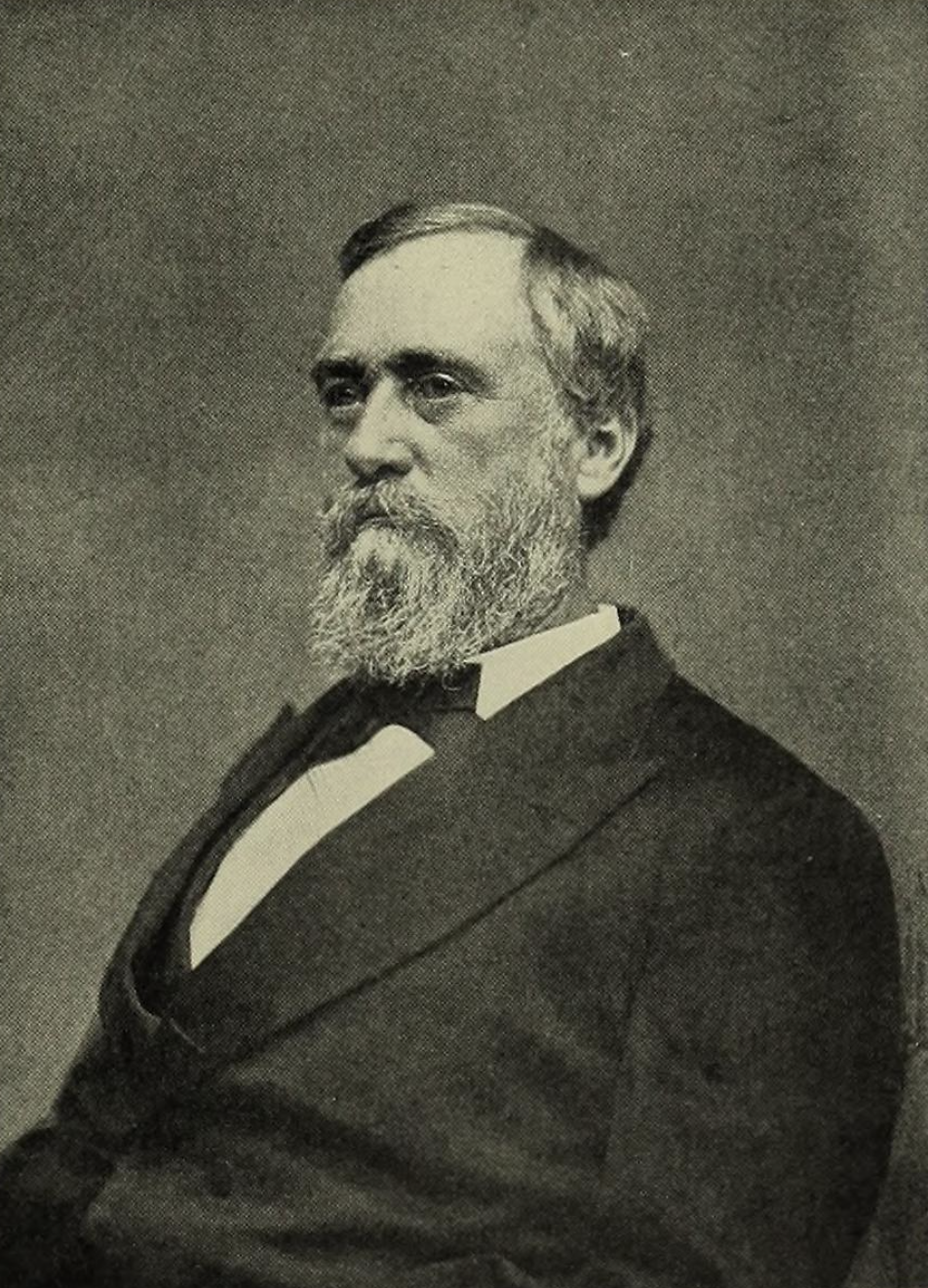
- Born: February 6, 1826; Shelby County, Kentucky
- Died: June 11, 1875 (aged 49); Cambridge, Massachusetts
- Education: Shelby College
- Occupations: Astronomer, mathematician
- Spouse: Isabella Washington (m. 1856)
- Children: 6
- Eponym: Winlock crater

3rd Director of the Harvard College Observatory
- In office 1866–1875
- Preceded by: George Phillips Bond
- Succeeded by: Edward Charles Pickering

Joseph Winlock (February 6, 1826 – June 11, 1875) was an American astronomer and mathematician.

== Biography ==
He was born in Shelby County, Kentucky, the grandson of General Joseph Winlock (1758–1831). After graduating from Shelby College in Kentucky in 1845, he was appointed professor of mathematics and astronomy at that institution.

From 1852 until 1857 he worked as a computer for the American Ephemeris and Nautical Almanac, and relocated to Cambridge, Massachusetts. He briefly served as head of the department of mathematics at the United States Naval Academy, but returned as superintendent of the Almanac office. He was elected a Fellow of the American Academy of Arts and Sciences in 1853.

He married Isabella Washington in Shelbyville, Kentucky on December 10, 1856, and they had six children.

In 1863 he was one of the fifty charter members of the National Academy of Sciences. Three year later in 1866 he became director of the Harvard College Observatory, succeeding George Bond, and making many improvements in the facility. He was also appointed professor of astronomy at Harvard. He remained at the university, eventually becoming professor of geodesy until his sudden death in Cambridge on June 11, 1875.

Much of his astronomical work included measurements with the meridian circle, a catalogue of double stars and stellar photometry investigations. He also led solar eclipse expeditions to Kentucky in 1860 and Spain in 1870.

The crater Winlock on the Moon is named after him.
