= Winlock (crater) =

Crater on the Moon

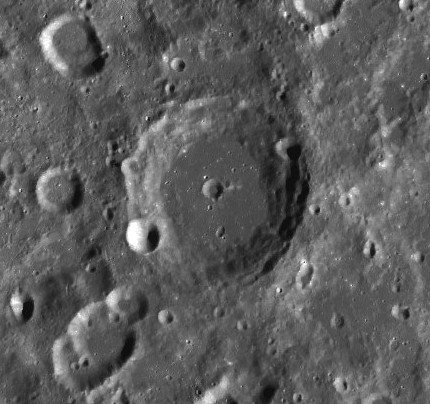
- Oblique Lunar Orbiter 5 image, facing west
- Coordinates: 35.40°N 105.92°W
- Diameter: 63.93 km (39.72 mi)
- Depth: Unknown
- Colongitude: 106° at sunrise
- Eponym: Joseph Winlock

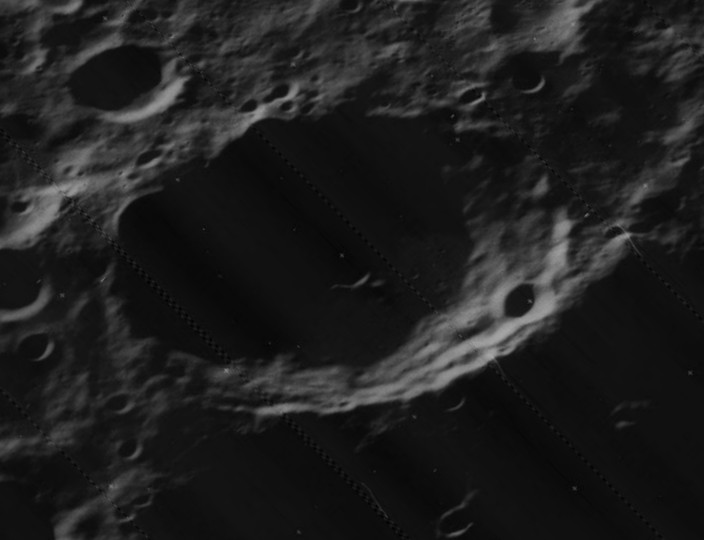
Oblique view

Winlock is a lunar impact crater on the far side of the Moon, where it lies to the west of the large walled plain called Lorentz. From the Earth this crater is located behind the northwestern limb, and just beyond the parts of the far side that are sometimes brought into view due to libration.

This is a reasonably well-formed crater, although it has suffered some erosion. There is a small crater lying across the rim to the southwest, and a smaller crater across the northeastern rim. The rim edge is otherwise relatively circular with some slight slumping along the inner edge. The interior floor is generally level, and the site where a central peak is usually located is instead occupied by a small craterlet.

Prior to formal naming by the IAU in 1970, Winlock was called Crater 174. The crater Winlock M, to the south of Winlock, was called Crater 175.

== Satellite craters ==
By convention these features are identified on lunar maps by placing the letter on the side of the crater midpoint that is closest to Winlock.

Winlock	Latitude	Longitude	Diameter
M	32.3° N	106.0° W	68 km
W	37.2° N	107.4° W	21 km
