= Axial parallelism =

Characteristic of a spinning body in space

Axial parallelism of Earth

Axial parallelism (also called gyroscopic stiffness, gyroscopic inertia, gyroscopic rigidity, or "rigidity in space") is the characteristic of a rotating body in which the direction of the axis of rotation remains fixed as the object moves through space. In astronomy, this characteristic is found in astronomical bodies in orbit. It is the same effect that causes a gyroscope's axis of rotation to remain constant as Earth rotates, allowing the devices to measure Earth's rotation.

== Examples ==
=== Earth's axial parallelism ===
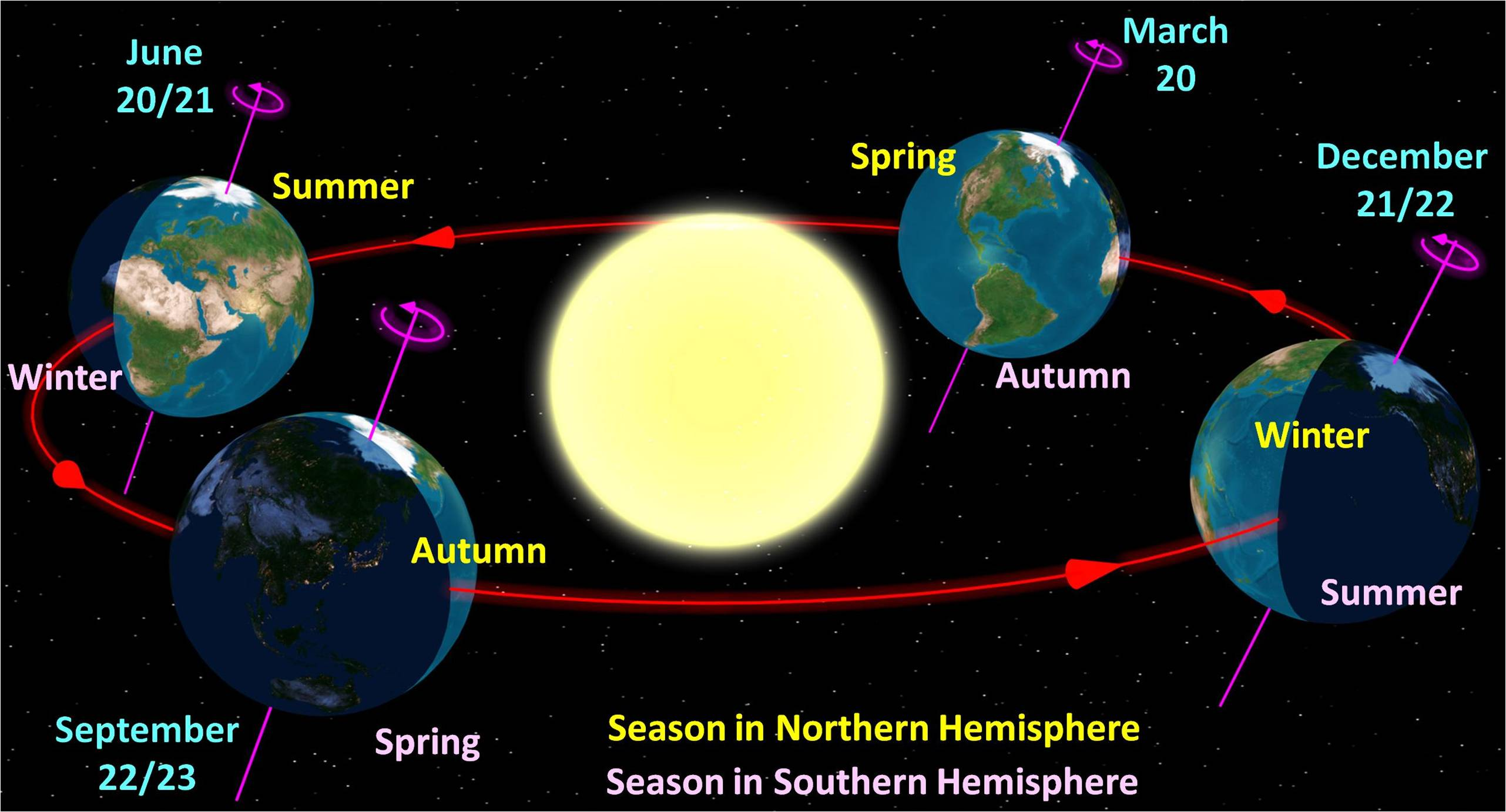
Axial parallelism of the Earth's tilted axis is a primary reason for the seasons

The Earth's orbit, with its axis tilted at 23.5 degrees, exhibits approximate axial parallelism, maintaining its direction towards Polaris (the "North Star") year-round. Together with the Earth's axial tilt, this is one of the primary reasons for the Earth's seasons, as illustrated by the diagram to the right. It is also the reason that the stars appear fixed in the night sky, such as a "fixed" pole star, throughout Earth's orbit around the Sun.

Minor variation in the direction of the axis, known as axial precession, takes place over the course of 26,000 years. As a result, over the next 11,000 years the Earth's axis will move to point towards Vega instead of Polaris.

=== Other astronomical examples ===
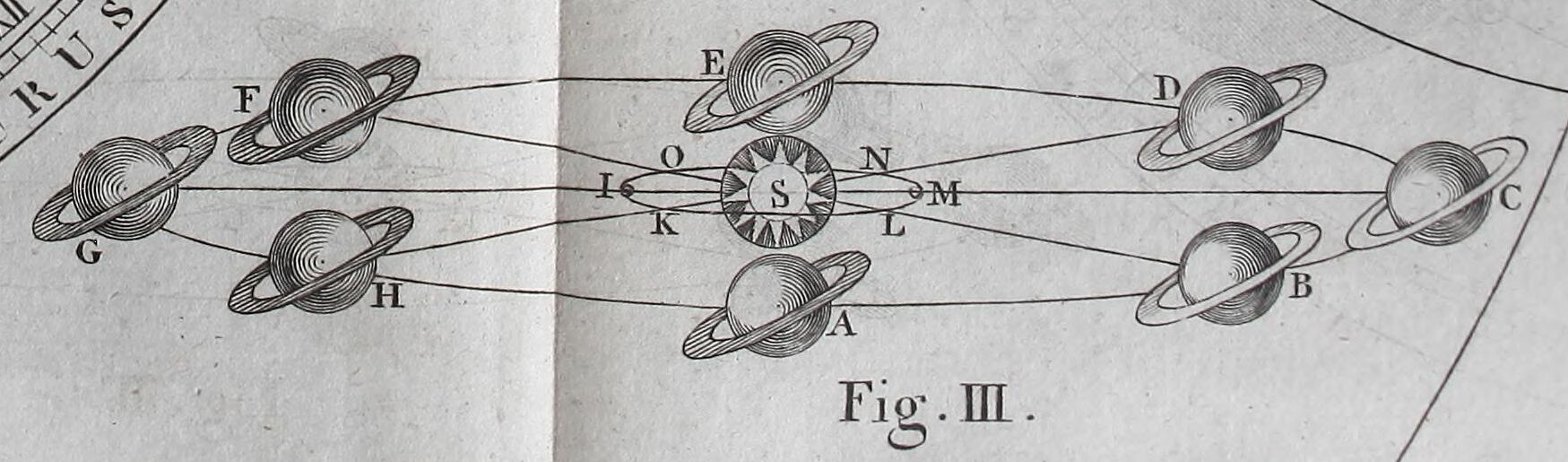
Axial parallelism of Saturn's rings, in a 17th-century work by James Ferguson (Scottish astronomer)

Axial parallelism can be seen in the Moon's tilted orbital plane. This results in the revolution of the lunar nodes relative to the Earth, causing an eclipse season approximately every six months, in which a solar eclipse can occur at the new moon phase and a lunar eclipse can occur at the full moon phase.

Axial parallelism is widely observed in astronomy. For example, the axial parallelism of the Moon's orbital plane is a key factor in the phenomenon of eclipses and constant libration of the moon. The Moon's orbital axis precesses a full circle during the 18 year, ten day saros cycle. When the Moon's orbital tilt exceeds at its peak the Earth's axial tilt, it is 28°36′ from the Earth's celestial equator, whereas when so far as anti-aligned (nine years five days later), the moon's orbital inclination the offset is approximately 18°20′. As such the moon, at this pace, alternates between figuring +5°09' from the ecliptic plane, down to −5°09' from it, more variance than the planets. Every 18.6 years, the angle between the Moon's orbit and Earth's equator reaches a maximum of 28°36′, the sum of Earth's equatorial tilt (23°27′) and the Moon's orbital inclination (5°09′) to the ecliptic. This is called major lunar standstill. Around this time, the Moon's declination will vary from −28°36′ to +28°36′. Conversely, 9.3 years later, the angle between the Moon's orbit and Earth's equator reaches its minimum of 18°20′. This is called a minor lunar standstill. A recent lunar standstill was in October 2015. At that time the descending node was lined up with the equinox (the point in the sky having right ascension zero and declination zero). Lunar nodes (key reference points during each orbit) seem to progress west by about 19° per year.

In addition, the rings of Saturn remain in a fixed direction as that planet rotates around the Sun.

== Explanation ==
Early gyroscopes were used to demonstrate the principle, most notably the Foucault's gyroscope experiment. Prior to the invention of the gyroscope, it had been explained by scientists in various ways. Early modern astronomer David Gregory, a contemporary of Isaac Newton, wrote:

To explain the Motion of the Celestial Bodies about their proper Axes, given in Position, and the Revolutions of them… If a Body be said to be moved about a given Axe, being in other respects not moved, that Axe is suppos'd to be unmov'd, and every point out of it to describe a Circle, to whose Plane the Axis is perpendicular. And for that reason, if a Body be carried along a line, and at the same time be revolved about a given Axe; the Axe, in all the time of the Body's motion, will continue parallel to it self. Nor is any thing else required to preserve this Parallelism, than that no other Motion besides these two be impressed upon the Body; for if there be no other third Motion in it, its Axe will continue always parallel to the Right-line, to which it was once parallel.

This gyroscopic effect is described in modern times as "gyroscopic stiffness" or "rigidity in space". The Newtonian mechanical explanation is known as the conservation of angular momentum.

== See also ==
- Axial tilt
- Polar motion
- Rotation around a fixed axis
- True polar wander
