= Nautical almanac =

Publication on celestial body positions

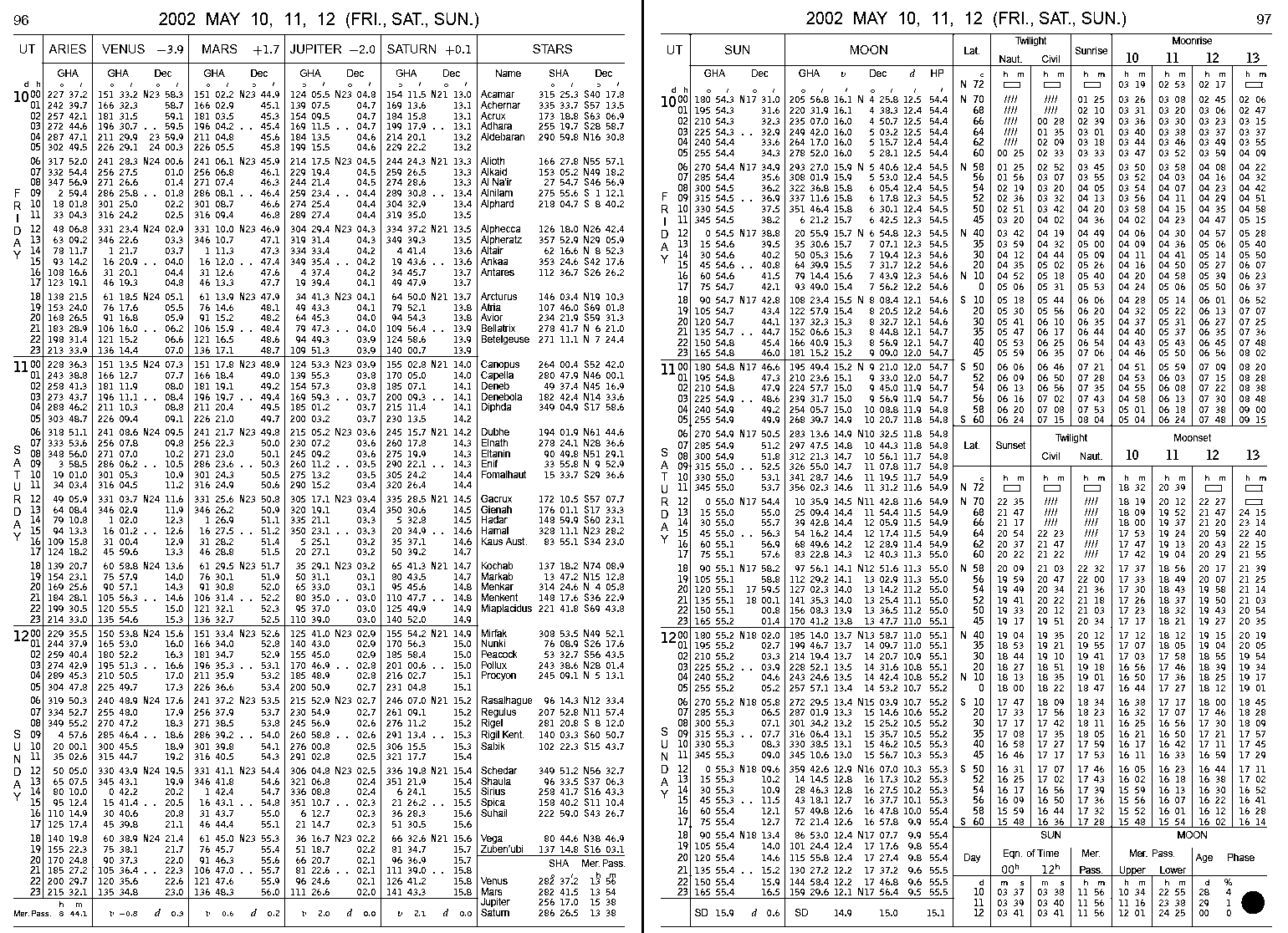
Two sample pages of the 2002 Nautical Almanac published by the U.S. Naval Observatory

A nautical almanac is a publication describing the positions of a selection of celestial bodies for the purpose of enabling navigators to use celestial navigation to determine the position of their ship while at sea. The Almanac specifies for each whole hour of the year the position on the Earth's surface (in declination and Greenwich hour angle) at which the Sun, Moon, planets, and First Point of Aries is directly overhead. The positions of 57 selected stars are specified relative to the First Point of Aries.

In Great Britain, The Nautical Almanac has been published annually by HM Nautical Almanac Office, ever since the first edition was published in 1767. In the United States, a nautical almanac has been published annually by the US Naval Observatory since 1852. It was originally titled American Ephemeris and Nautical Almanac. Since 1958, the USNO and HMNAO have jointly published a unified nautical almanac, The Astronomical Almanac for use by the navies of both countries. Almanac data is now available online from the US Naval Observatory.

Also commercial almanacs were produced that combined other information. A good example would be Brown's, which commenced in 1877, and is still produced annually, its early 20th-century subtitle being "Harbour and Dock Guide and Advertiser and Daily Tide Tables". This combination of trade advertising, and information "by permission... of the Hydrographic Department of the Admiralty" provided a useful compendium of information. More recent editions have kept up with the changes in technology: the 1924 edition, for instance, had extensive advertisements for coaling stations. Meanwhile, the Reeds Nautical Almanac, published by Adlard Coles Nautical, has been in print since 1932, and in 1944 was used by landing craft involved in the Normandy landings.

The "Air Almanac" of the United States and Great Britain tabulates celestial coordinates for 10-minute intervals for use in aerial navigation. The Sokkia Corporation's annual "Celestial Observation Handbook and Ephemeris" tabulated daily celestial coordinates (to a tenth of an arcsecond) for the Sun and nine stars; it was last published for 2008.

To find the position of a ship or aircraft by celestial navigation, the navigator measures with a sextant the apparent height of a celestial body above the horizon, and notes the time from a marine chronometer. That height is compared with the height predicted for a trial position; the arcminutes of height difference is how many nautical miles the position line is from the trial position.

== See also ==
- Bowditch's American Practical Navigator
