= Astronomical Almanac =

Annual publication containing astronomical information

The Astronomical Almanac is an almanac published by the United Kingdom Hydrographic Office; it also includes data supplied by many scientists from around the world. On page vii, the listed major contributors to its various Sections are: H.M Nautical Almanac Office, United Kingdom Hydrographic Office; the Nautical Almanac Office, United States Naval Observatory; the Jet Propulsion Laboratory, California Institute of Technology; the IAU Standards Of Fundamental Astronomy (SOFA) initiative; the Institut de Mécanique Céleste et des Calcul des Éphémerides, Paris Observatory; and the Minor Planet Center, Cambridge, Massachusetts.

It is a worldwide resource for fundamental astronomical data. Its authors describe it as a reference product that maintains international standards, so it has to incorporate and explain new procedures adopted by the International Astronomical Union; the 2006 edition, published in January 2005, was the first to implement the IAU 2000 resolutions on precession-nutation, the Celestial Intermediate Origin and the Earth Rotation Angle. The almanac largely contains Solar System ephemerides and catalogs of selected stellar and extragalactic objects. Its ephemerides are based on the JPL Solar System integration "DE440". The material appears in sections, each section addressing a specific astronomical category. The book also includes references to the material, explanations, and examples. It used to be available up to one year in advance of its date, however the current 2024 edition became available only one month in advance; in December 2023.

The Astronomical Almanac Online was a companion website to the printed volume, maintained by HM Nautical Almanac Office. It did not duplicate all the data in the book, but extended the printed version with data best presented in machine-readable form, and in some cases with additional information or greater precision than the printed data. The 2024 printed edition of the Almanac states on page iv: "The web companion to The Astronomical Almanac has been withdrawn as of January 2023."

== Publication contents ==
Section A
PHENOMENA: includes information on the seasons, phases of the Moon, configurations of the planets, eclipses, transits of Mercury or Venus, sunrise/set, moonrise/set times, and times for twilight. Preprints of many of these data appear in Astronomical Phenomena, another joint publication by USNO and HMNAO.

Section B
TIME-SCALES AND COORDINATE SYSTEMS: contains calendar information, relationships between time scales, universal and sidereal times, Earth rotation angle, definitions of the various celestial coordinate systems, frame bias, precession, nutation, obliquity, intermediate system, the position and velocity of the Earth, and coordinates of Polaris. Preprints of many of these data also appear in Astronomical Phenomena.

Section C
SUN: detailed positional information on the Sun, including the ecliptic and equatorial coordinates, physical ephemerides, geocentric rectangular coordinates, times of transit, and the equation of time.

Section D
MOON: contains detailed positional information on the Moon including phases, mean elements of the orbit and rotation, lengths of mean months, ecliptic and equatorial coordinates, librations, and physical ephemerides.

Section E
PLANETS: consist of detailed positional information on each of the major planets including osculating orbital elements, heliocentric ecliptic and geocentric equatorial coordinates, and physical ephemerides.

Section F
NATURAL SATELLITES: orbital and physical data, ephemerides and phenomena of the satellites of Mars, Jupiter, Saturn (including the rings), Uranus, Neptune, and Pluto.

Section G
DWARF PLANETS AND SMALL SOLAR SYSTEM BODIES: includes positional and physical data on selected dwarf planets, positional information on bright minor planets and periodic comets.

Section H
STARS AND STELLAR SYSTEMS: Beginning with the almanac for the year 2025, the data has been reduced from earlier years to navigational stars, Spectrophotometric standard stars, and ICRF3 radio source positions. Readers are referred to https://aa.usno.navy.mil/publications/asa for other data.

Section J
LUNARCENTRIC CELESTIAL OBJECTS: Beginning in the almanac for the year 2025, tables of celestial objects as observed from the lunar south pole replace the list of observatories that was in earlier editions.

Section K
TABLES AND DATA: includes Julian dates, selected astronomical constants, relations between time scales, coordinates of the celestial pole, reduction of terrestrial coordinates, interpolations methods, vectors and matrices.

Section L
NOTES AND REFERENCES: gives notes on the data and references for source material found in the almanac.

Section M
GLOSSARY: contains terms and definitions for many of the words and phrases.

== Publication history ==
The Astronomical Almanac is the direct descendant of the British and American navigational almanacs. The British Nautical Almanac and Astronomical Ephemeris had been published since 1766, and was renamed The Astronomical Ephemeris in 1960. The American Ephemeris and Nautical Almanac had been published since 1852. In 1981 the British and American publications were combined under the title The Astronomical Almanac."

== Explanatory Supplement to the Astronomical Almanac ==
The Explanatory Supplement to the Astronomical Almanac, currently in its third edition (2013), provides detailed discussion of usage and data reduction methods used by the Astronomical Almanac. It covers its history, significance, sources, methods of computation, and use of the data. Because the Astronomical Almanac prints primarily positional data, this book goes into great detail on techniques to get astronomical positions. Earlier editions of the supplement were published in 1961 and in 1992.

== See also ==
- American Ephemeris and Nautical Almanac (specific title)
- Astronomical Ephemeris (generic article)
- Nautical almanac (generic article)
- The Nautical Almanac (familiar name for a specific series of (official British) publications which appeared under a variety of different full titles for the period 1767 to 1959, as well as being a specific official title (jointly UK/US-published) for 1960 onwards)
- Jet Propulsion Laboratory Development Ephemeris (used by the Astronomical Almanac)
