= Jet Propulsion Laboratory Development Ephemeris =

Series of mathematical models of the Solar System

Jet Propulsion Laboratory Development Ephemeris (abbreviated JPL DE(number), or simply DE(number)) designates one of a series of mathematical models of the Solar System produced at the Jet Propulsion Laboratory in Pasadena, California, for use in spacecraft navigation and astronomy. The models consist of numeric representations of positions, velocities and accelerations of major Solar System bodies, tabulated at equally spaced intervals of time, covering a specified span of years. Barycentric rectangular coordinates of the Sun, eight major planets and Pluto, and geocentric coordinates of the Moon are tabulated.

== History ==
There have been many versions of the JPL DE, from the 1960s through the present, in support of both robotic and crewed spacecraft missions. Available documentation is limited, but we know DE69 was announced in 1969 to be the third release of the JPL Ephemeris Tapes, and was a special purpose, short-duration ephemeris. The then-current JPL Export Ephemeris was DE19. These early releases were distributed on magnetic tape.

In the days before personal computers, computers were large and expensive, and numerical integrations such as these were run by large organizations with ample resources. The JPL ephemerides prior to DE405 were integrated on a Univac mainframe in double precision. For instance, DE102, which was created in 1977, took six million steps and ran for nine days on a Univac 1100/81. DE405 was integrated on a DEC Alpha in quadruple precision.

In the 1970s and early 1980s, much work was done in the astronomical community to update the astronomical almanacs from the theoretical work of the 1890s to modern, relativistic theory. From 1975 through 1982, six ephemerides were produced at JPL using the modern techniques of least-squares adjustment of numerically-integrated output to high precision data: DE96 in Nov. 1975, DE102 in Sep. 1977, DE111 in May 1980, DE118 in Sep. 1981, and DE200 in 1982. DE102 was the first numerically integrated so-called Long Ephemeris, covering much of history for which useful astronomical observations were available: 1411 BC to AD 3001. DE200, a version of DE118 migrated to the J2000.0 reference frame, was adopted as the fundamental ephemeris for the new almanacs starting in 1984. DE402 introduced coordinates referred to the International Celestial Reference Frame (ICRF). DE440 and DE441 were published in 2021, with improvements in the orbits of Jupiter, Saturn and Pluto from more recent spacecraft observations.

JPL ephemerides have been the basis of the ephemerides of sun, moon and planets in the Astronomical Almanac since the volumes for 1984 through 2002, which used JPL's ephemeris DE200. (From 2003 through 2014 the basis was updated to use DE405, and further updated from 2015 when DE430 began to be used.)

== Construction ==
Each ephemeris was produced by numerical integration of the equations of motion, starting from a set of initial conditions. Due to the precision of modern observational data, the analytical method of general perturbations could no longer be applied to a high enough accuracy to adequately reproduce the observations. The method of special perturbations was applied, using numerical integration to solve the n-body problem, in effect putting the entire Solar System into motion in the computer's memory, accounting for all relevant physical laws. The initial conditions were both constants such as planetary masses, from outside sources, and parameters such as initial positions and velocities, adjusted to produce output which was a "best fit" to a large set of observations. A least-squares technique was used to perform the fitting. As of DE421, perturbations from 343 asteroids, representing about 90% of the mass of the main asteroid belt, have been included in the dynamical model.

The physics modeled included the mutual Newtonian gravitational accelerations and their relativistic corrections (a modified form of the Einstein-Infeld-Hoffmann equations), the accelerations caused by the tidal distortion of the Earth, the accelerations caused by the figure of the Earth and Moon, and a model of the lunar librations.

The observational data in the fits has been an evolving set, including: ranges (distances) to planets measured by radio signals from spacecraft, direct radar-ranging of planets, two-dimensional position fixes (on the plane of the sky) by VLBI of spacecraft, transit and CCD telescopic observations of planets and small bodies, and laser-ranging of retroreflectors on the Moon, among others. DE102, for instance, was fit to 48,479 observations.

The time argument of the JPL integrated ephemerides, in early versions known as T_{eph}, became recognized as a relativistic coordinate time scale, as is necessary in precise work to account for the small relativistic effects of time dilation and simultaneity. The IAU's 2006 redefinition of TDB became essentially equivalent to T_{eph}, and the redefined TDB has been explicitly adopted in recent versions of the JPL ephemerides.

== Distribution ==
Positions and velocities of the Sun, Earth, Moon, and planets, along with the orientation of the Moon, are stored as Chebyshev polynomial coefficients fit in 32 day-long segments. The ephemerides are now available via World Wide Web and FTP as data files containing the Chebyshev coefficients, along with source code to recover (calculate) positions and velocities. Files vary in the time periods they cover, ranging from a few hundred years to several thousand, and bodies they include. Data may be based on each planet's geometric center or a planetary-system barycenter.

The use of Chebyshev polynomials enables highly precise, efficient calculations for any given point in time. DE405 calculation for the inner planets "recovers" accuracy of about 0.001 seconds of arc (arcseconds) (equivalent to about 1 km at the distance of Mars); for the outer planets it is generally about 0.1 arcseconds. The 'reduced accuracy' DE406 ephemeris gives an interpolating precision (relative to the full ephemeris values) no worse than 25 metres for any planet and no worse than 1 metre for the Moon.

Note that these precision numbers are for the interpolated values relative to the original tabulated coordinates. The overall precision and accuracy of interpolated values for describing the actual motions of the planets will be a function of both the precision of the ephemeris tabulated coordinates and the precision of the interpolation.

== Applications ==
- JPL uses the ephemerides for navigation of spacecraft throughout the Solar System. Typically, a new ephemeris is computed including the latest available observations of the target planet(s), either for planning of the mission(s), or for final contact of the spacecraft with the target. See below, Recent ephemerides in the series.
- The Astronomical Almanac for 1984 through 2002 were based on JPL ephemeris DE200, and from 2003 to 2014 the Astronomical Almanac was based on JPL ephemeris DE405. As of 2024, the Almanac is derived from DE440.
- The JPL ephemerides are widely used for planetary science; some examples are included in the Notes and References.
- Software is available to use the JPL ephemerides for the production of apparent ephemerides for any location and time; these are widely used by professional and amateur astronomers for reducing planetary observations and producing very precise observing guides.
- Recent ephemerides can be used with the planetarium software Stellarium.

== Ephemerides in the series ==
Ephemerides for Solar System bodies are available through a JPL website and via FTP.

=== Latest releases ===
DE440 was created in June 2020. The new DE440 / 441 general-purpose planetary solution includes seven additional years of ground and space-based astrometric data, data calibrations, and dynamical model improvements, most significantly involving Jupiter, Saturn, Pluto, and the Kuiper belt. Inclusion of 30 new Kuiper-belt masses, and the Kuiper belt ring mass, results in a time-varying shift of ~100 km in DE440's barycenter relative to DE430. The 114-megabyte ephemeris files include the orientation of the Moon. It spans the years 1550–2650. JPL started transitioning to DE440 in early April 2021. Supplemental versions are also available which include the planetary geometric center of Mars as well as Mars' barycenter.

DE441 was created in June 2020. This ephemeris is longer than DE440, -13,200 to 17,191, but less accurate (due to neglecting lunar core-mantle damping). It is useful for analyzing historical observations that are outside the span of DE440.

DE442 was created in May 2024 with the primary purpose of updating the ephemeris of the Uranus barycenter to support the development of the Uranus satellite ephemeris URA182. DE442 is essentially an update of the planetary ephemeris DE440, incorporating Uranus occultation data as well as additional Mars orbiter ranging data and Juno ranging data spanning an additional four years.

=== Past releases ===
DE102 was created in 1981; includes nutations but not librations. Referred to the dynamical equator and equinox of 1950. Covers early 1410 BC through late 3002 AD.

DE200 was created in 1981; includes nutations but not librations. Referred to the dynamical equator and equinox of 2000. Covers late 1599 AD through early 2169 AD. This ephemeris was used for the Astronomical Almanac from 1984 to 2003.

DE202 was created in 1987; includes nutations and librations. Referred to the dynamical equator and equinox of 2000. Covers late 1899 through 2049.

DE402 was released in 1995, and was quickly superseded by DE403.

DE403 was created 1993, released in 1995, expressed in the coordinates of the International Earth Rotation Service (IERS) reference frame, essentially the ICRF. The data compiled by JPL to derive the ephemeris began to move away from limited-accuracy telescopic observations and more toward higher-accuracy radar-ranging of the planets, radio-ranging of spacecraft, and very-long-baseline-interferometric (VLBI) observations of spacecraft, especially for the four inner planets. Telescopic observations remained important for the outer planets because of their distance, hence the inability to bounce radar off of them, and the difficulty of parking a spacecraft near them. The perturbations of 300 asteroids were included, vs DE118/DE200 which included only the five asteroids determined to cause the largest perturbations. Better values of the planets' masses had been found since DE118/DE200, further refining the perturbations. Lunar Laser Ranging accuracy was improved, giving better positions of the Moon. DE403 covered the time span early 1599 to mid 2199.

DE404 was released in 1996. A so-called Long Ephemeris, this condensed version of DE403 covered 3000 BC to AD 3000. While both DE403 and DE404 were integrated over the same timespan, the interpolation of DE404 was somewhat reduced in accuracy and nutation of the Earth and libration of the Moon were not included.

DE405 was released in 1998. It added several years' extra data from telescopic, radar, spacecraft, and VLBI observations (of the Galileo spacecraft at Jupiter, in particular). The method of modeling the asteroids' perturbations was improved, although the same number of asteroids were modeled. The ephemeris was more accurately oriented onto the ICRF. DE405 covered 1600 to 2200 to full precision. This ephemeris was utilized in the Astronomical Almanac from 2003 until 2014.

DE406 was released with DE405 in 1998. A Long Ephemeris, this was the condensed version of DE405, covering 3000 BC to AD 3000 with the same limitations as DE404. This is the same integration as DE405, with the accuracy of the interpolating polynomials has been lessened to reduce file size for the longer time span covered by the file.

DE407 was apparently unreleased. Details in readily-available sources are sketchy.

DE408 was an unreleased ephemeris, created in 2005 as a longer version of DE406, covering 20,000 years.

DE409 was released in 2003 for the Mars Exploration Rover spacecraft arrival at Mars and the Cassini arrival at Saturn. Further spacecraft ranging and VLBI (to the Mars Global Surveyor, Mars Pathfinder and the Mars Odyssey spacecraft) and telescopic data were included in the fit. The orbits of the Pioneer and Voyager spacecraft were reprocessed to give data points for Saturn. These resulted in improvements over DE405, especially to the predicted positions of Mars and Saturn. DE409 covered the years 1901 to 2019.

DE410 was also released in 2003 covered 1901 - 2019, with improvements from DE409 in the masses for Venus, Mars, Jupiter, Saturn and the Earth-Moon system based on recent research. Though the masses had not yet been adopted by the IAU. The ephemerides were created to support the arrivals of the MER and Cassini spacecraft.

DE411 was widely cited in the astronomical community, but not publicly released by JPL

DE412 was widely cited in the astronomical community, but not publicly released by JPL

DE413 was released in 2004 with updated ephemeris of Pluto in support of the occultation of a star by its satellite Charon on 11 Jul 2005. DE413 was fit to new CCD telescopic observations of Pluto in order to give improved positions of the planet and its moon.

DE414 was created in 2005 and released in 2006. The numerical integration software was updated to use quadruple-precision for the Newtonian part of the equations of motion. Ranging data to the Mars Global Surveyor and Mars Odyssey spacecraft were extended to 2005, and further CCD observations of the five outer planets were included in the fit. Some data was accidentally left out of the fit, namely Magellan Venus data for 1992-94 and Galileo Jupiter data for 1996-97. Some ranging data to the NEAR Shoemaker spacecraft orbiting the asteroid Eros was used to derive the Earth/Moon mass ratio. DE414 covered the years 1599 to 2201.

DE418 was released in 2007 for planning the New Horizons mission to Pluto. New observations of Pluto, which took advantage of the new astrometric accuracy of the Hipparcos star catalog, were included in the fit. Mars spacecraft ranging and VLBI observations were updated through 2007. Asteroid masses were estimated differently. Lunar laser ranging data for the Moon was added for the first time since DE403, significantly improving the lunar orbit and librations. Estimated position data from the Cassini spacecraft was included in the fit, improving the orbit of Saturn, but rigorous analysis of the data was deferred to a later date. DE418 covered the years 1899 to 2051, and JPL recommended not using it outside of that range due to minor inconsistencies which remained in the planets' masses due to time constraints.

DE421 was released in 2008. It included additional ranging and VLBI measurements of Mars spacecraft, new ranging and VLBI of the Venus Express spacecraft, the latest estimates of planetary masses, additional lunar laser ranging, and two more months of CCD measurements of Pluto. When initially released in 2008, the DE421 ephemeris covered the years 1900 to 2050. An additional data release in 2013 extended the coverage to the year 2200.

DE422 was created in 2009 for the MESSENGER mission to Mercury. A Long Ephemeris, it was intended to replace DE406, covering 3000 BC to AD 3000.

DE423 was released in 2010. Position estimates of the MESSENGER spacecraft and additional range and VLBI data from the Venus Express spacecraft were fit. DE423 covered the years 1799 to 2200.

DE424 was created in 2011 to support the Mars Science Laboratory mission.

DE430 was created in 2013 and Is intended for use in analyzing modern data. It covers the dates 1550 January 1 to 2650 January 22 with the most accurate lunar ephemeris. From 2015 onwards this ephemeris is utilized in the Astronomical Almanac. Beginning with this release only Mars' Barycenter was included due to the small masses of its moons Phobos and Deimos which create a very small offset from the planet's center. The complete ephemerides files is 128 megabytes but several alternative versions have been made available by JPL

DE431 was created in 2013 and is intended for analysis of earlier historical observations of the Sun, Moon, and planets. It covers a longer time span than DE430 (13201 BC to AD 17191) agreeing with DE430 within 1 meter over the time period covered by DE430. Position of the Moon is accurate within 20 meters between 1913-2113 and that error grows quadratically outside of that range. It is the largest of the ephemerides files at 3.4 gigabytes.

DE432 was created April 2014. It includes librations but no nutations. DE432 is a minor update to DE430, and is intended primarily to aid the New Horizons project targeting of Pluto.

DE436 was created in 2016 and was based on the DE430, with improved orbital data for Jupiter specifically for the Juno mission).

DE438 was created in 2018 and was based on the DE430, with improved orbital data for Mercury (for the MESSENGER mission), Mars (for the Mars Odyssey and Mars Reconnaissance Orbiters), and Jupiter (for Juno).

== See also ==
- Jet Propulsion Laboratory
- Fundamental ephemeris
- VSOP model

== Sources ==
- Standish; Newhall; Williams; Yeomans (1992), "CHAPTER 5: Orbital Ephemerides of the Sun, Moon, and Planets", in Seidelmann (ed.), Explanatory Supplement to the Astronomical Almanac (1 ed.), Mill Valley, CA: University Science Books, ISBN 978-0-935702-68-2.
- Standish; Williams. "CHAPTER 8: Orbital Ephemerides of the Sun, Moon, and Planets" (PDF). ssd.jpl.nasa.gov (FTP). (To view documents see Help:FTP) an unpublished, updated version of the above source.
