= American Ephemeris and Nautical Almanac =

Book of astronomical data for navigation

The American Ephemeris and Nautical Almanac was published for the years 1855 to 1980, containing information necessary for astronomers, surveyors, and navigators. It was based on the original British publication, The Nautical Almanac and Astronomical Ephemeris, with which it merged to form The Astronomical Almanac, published from the year 1981 to the present.

== History ==
Authorized by Congress in 1849, the American Nautical Almanac Office was founded and attached to the Department of the Navy with Charles Henry Davis as the first superintendent. The American Ephemeris and Nautical Almanac was first published in 1852, containing data for the year 1855. Its data was originally calculated by human "computers", such as Chauncey Wright and Joseph Winlock. Between 1855 and 1881 it had two parts, the first for the meridian of Greenwich contained data on the Sun, Moon, lunar distances, Venus, Mars, Jupiter, and Saturn, which was published separately as The American Nautical Almanac. The second part contained data for the meridian of Washington on the Sun, Moon, planets, principal stars, eclipses, occultations, and other phenomena. Beginning in 1882, data for Mercury, Uranus, and Neptune was added to the first part, with eclipses, occultations, and other phenomena forming a separate third part. In 1916, The American Nautical Almanac ceased to be a reprint of the first part of the American Ephemeris and Nautical Almanac, becoming a separately prepared volume for the navigator. In 1937, the American Ephemeris and Nautical Almanac was divided into seven parts, with data for the meridian of Washington substantially reduced, then eliminated beginning in 1951. Data for Pluto was added in 1950.

Beginning in 1960, all parts except for a few introductory pages were jointly calculated and typeset by the American Nautical Almanac Office and Her Majesty's Nautical Almanac Office but published separately within The American Ephemeris and Nautical Almanac and The Astronomical Ephemeris, a new name for the old British title The Nautical Almanac and Astronomical Ephemeris. Beginning in 1981, the title The American Ephemeris and Nautical Almanac and the British title The Astronomical Ephemeris were completely merged under the single title The Astronomical Almanac.

== See also ==
- Astronomical Almanac (specific title)
- Astronomical Ephemeris (generic article)
- Almanac (generic article)
- Nautical almanac (generic article)
- The Nautical Almanac (familiar name for a specific series of (official British) publications which appeared under a variety of different full titles for the period 1767 to 1959, as well as being a specific official title (jointly UK/US-published) for 1960 onwards)
