= The Nautical Almanac =

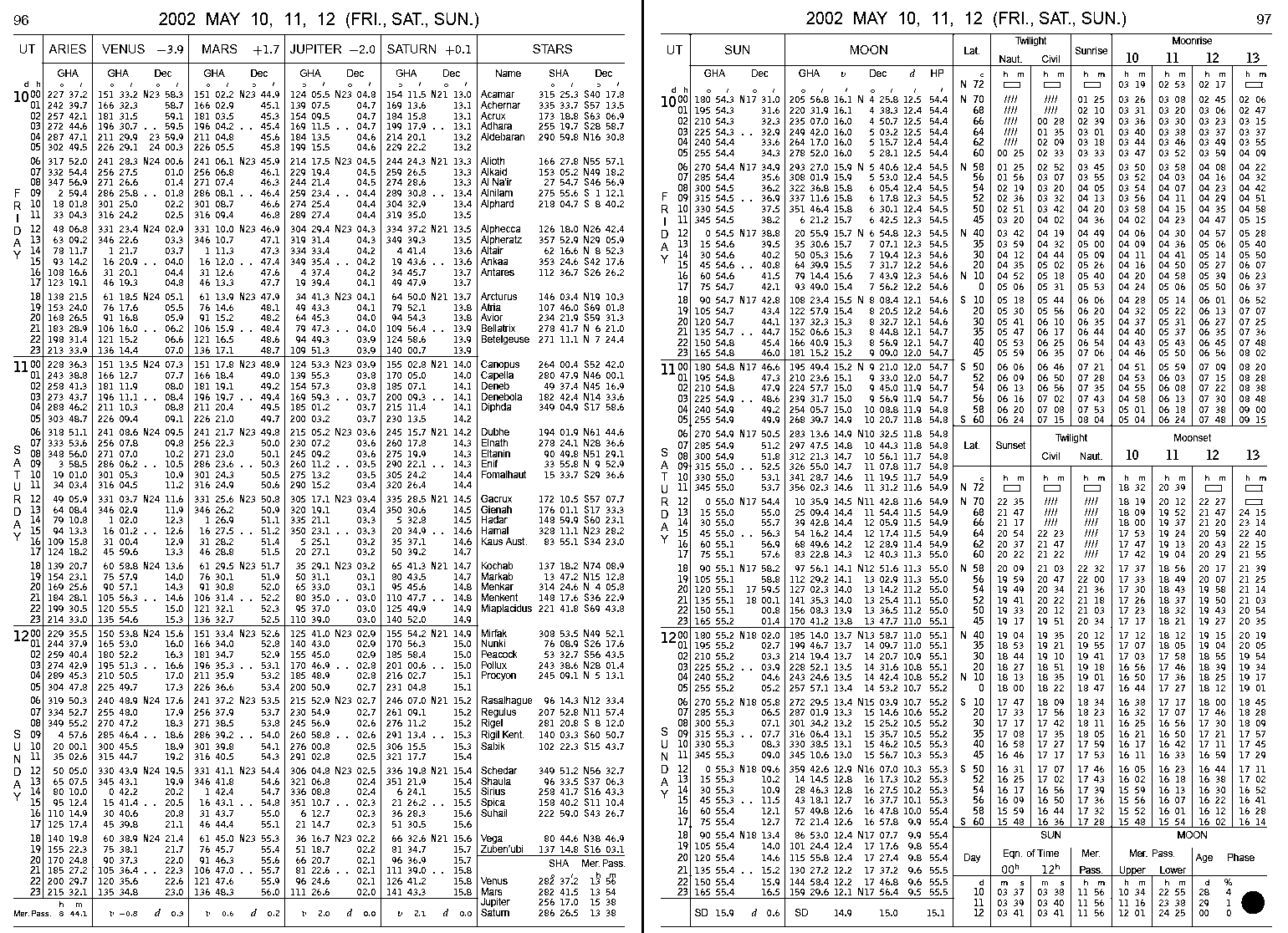
Two sample pages of the 2002 Nautical Almanac

The Nautical Almanac has been the familiar name for a series of official British almanacs published under various titles since the first issue of The Nautical Almanac and Astronomical Ephemeris, for 1767: this was the first nautical almanac to contain data dedicated to the convenient determination of longitude at sea. It was originally published from the Royal Greenwich Observatory in England. A detailed account of how the publication was produced in its earliest years has been published by the National Maritime Museum.

Since 1958 (with the issue for the year 1960), His Majesty's Nautical Almanac Office and the US Naval Observatory have jointly published a unified Nautical Almanac, for use by the navies of both countries.

== Publication history ==
The changing names and contents of related titles in the series are summarised as follows. (The issue years mentioned below are those for which the data in the relevant issue were calculated—and the issues were in practice published in advance of the year for which they were calculated, at different periods of history, anything from 1 to 5 years in advance).

(For many years, official nautical almanacs and astronomical ephemerides in the UK and the USA had a linked history, and they became merged in both titles and contents in 1981.)

In the UK, the official publications have been:

=== 1767–1959 ===
For 1767–1959, The Nautical Almanac and Astronomical Ephemeris contained both astro-navigational and general astronomical data (this complete publication was often referred to, for short, especially in the earlier years, as just The Nautical Almanac). From 1832, responsibility for publication was transferred to His Majesty's Nautical Almanac Office.

The main distinctive feature of the inaugural issue for 1767 was the tabulation of lunar distances as a tool to facilitate the determination of longitude at sea from observations of the Moon. Within a few years, the publishers of almanacs of other countries began to adopt the practice of tabulating lunar distances. Lunar distances continued to be published in the UK official almanacs until 1906, by which time their use had declined in practice. For some time thereafter, in the issues for the years 1907–1919, examples of how to calculate them were given instead.

Time: The issues for 1767 to 1833 gave their ephemeris tabulations in terms of Greenwich apparent (not mean) time. This was on the grounds that an important class of user was the 'Mariner', and that 'apparent Time' was "the same which he will obtain by the Altitudes of the Sun or Stars in the Manner hereafter prescribed". Mean time at Greenwich (i.e. mean solar time) was adopted as from the issue for 1834 and continued to 1959. Until the issue for 1924, the time argument for Greenwich Mean Time was counted from 0h starting at Greenwich mean noon (on the civil day with the same number), and starting with the issue for 1925 the commencement point of the time argument was changed so that 0h became midnight at the beginning of the civil day with the relevant number, to coincide for the future with the civil reckoning.

During parts of the period 1767–1959, separate subsidiary titles dedicated to navigation were also published:

- For 1896–1913: Part 1 of the Nautical Almanac and Astronomical Ephemeris (containing the astro-navigational data) was also published separately as The Nautical Almanac & Astronomical Ephemeris, Part 1.
- For 1914–1951: the former Part 1 (after redesign) was renamed The Nautical Almanac Abridged for the Use of Seamen.
- For 1952–1959: after further redesign, it was again renamed, as The Abridged Nautical Almanac (and renamed yet again for 1960 onwards as simply The Nautical Almanac).

=== 1960–1980 ===
From the issues for 1960, the official titles were redesigned and unified (as to content) between the UK and USA, under the titles (in UK) The Astronomical Ephemeris and (separately) The Nautical Almanac.

Time: A major change introduced with the 1960 issue of The Astronomical Ephemeris was the use of ephemeris time in place of mean solar time for the major ephemeris tabulations. But the Nautical Almanac, now continuing as a separate publication addressed largely to navigators, continued to give tabulations based on mean solar time (UT).

=== 1981 to date ===
For 1981 to date, the official titles have been unified in UK and USA (as to title as well as (redesigned) content): The Astronomical Almanac and The Nautical Almanac.

== The British Nautical Almanac in the United States ==
In the US, an official (and initially separate) series of ephemeris publications began with the issue for 1855 as The American Ephemeris and Nautical Almanac; but before that, the British Nautical Almanac was commonly used on American ships and in the United States – sometimes in the form of an independently printed American 'impression' instead.

== Modern alternative data sources ==
Almanac data is now also available online from the US Naval Observatory in Washington D.C.

== Bibliography ==
- Mary Croarken (2002 September). Journal of Maritime Research (Greenwich: National Maritime Museum). doi:10.1080/21533369.2002.9668324
