= Calendar (New Style) Act 1750 =

British law adopting the Gregorian calendar

Calendar (New Style) Act 1750 (Note: The citation of this act by this short title was authorised by section 1 of, and the first schedule to, the Short Titles Act 1896. Due to the repeal of those provisions it is now authorised by section 19(2) of the Interpretation Act 1978.)
- Act of Parliament
- Parliament of Great Britain
- Long title: An Act for regulating the Commencement of the Year, and for correcting the Calendar now in Use.
- Citation: 24 Geo. 2. c. 23
- Introduced by: Lord Chesterfield (Lords)
- Territorial extent: "In and throughout all his Majesty's dominions and countries in Europe, Asia, Africa, and America"

Dates
- Royal assent: 22 May 1751 (Note: At the time, acts were dated according to the start of the session of Parliament, rather than according to current practice of dating according to the day when royal assent was given. Hence the date of this act is 1750, not 1751. This point is explained in more detail in the article.)
- Commencement: 1 January 1752 (Note: Section 1.)
Other legislation
Amended by	Calendar Act 1751; Cattle Distemper, Vagrancy, Marshalsea Prison, etc. Act 1753; Exchequer Court (Scotland) Act 1856; Anniversary Days Observance Act 1859; Easter Act 1928; Statute Law Revision Act 1948; Statute Law (Repeals) Act 1971; Statute Law (Repeals) Act 1986
Relates to	Herring Fishery Act 1753; Easter Act 1928

Status: Amended

Text of statute as originally enacted

Text of the Calendar (New Style) Act 1750 as in force today (including any amendments) within the United Kingdom, from legislation.gov.uk.

The Calendar (New Style) Act 1750 (24 Geo. 2. c. 23), also known as Chesterfield's Act or (in American usage) the British Calendar Act of 1751, is an act of the Parliament of Great Britain. Its purpose was for Great Britain and the British Empire to adopt the Gregorian calendar (in effect). (Note: The act makes no reference to Pope Gregory, since to do so might imply recognition of Papal primacy. It defined a calendar identical to the Gregorian system, from the same first principles. For more background, see section #Calculation of the date of Easter: the Computus.) The act also changed the start of the legal year from 25 March to 1 January. (Note: Except in Scotland, which had already changed to 1 January, starting in 1600.)

The act elided eleven days from September 1752. It ordered that religious feast days be held on their traditional dates – for example, Christmas Day remained on 25 December. (Easter is a moveable feast: the act specifies how its date should be calculated.) It ordered that civil and market days – for example the quarter days on which rent was due, salaries paid and new labour contracts agreed – be moved forward in the calendar by eleven days so that no-one should gain or lose by the change and that markets match the agricultural season. It is for this reason that the UK personal tax year ends on 5 April, being eleven days on from the original quarter-day of 25 March (Lady Day).

== Provisions ==
The act has three key elements:

- It acknowledges the practical difficulties created for England by its traditional practice of beginning the year on 25 March, when common practice among its people, (Note: For example, see the Diary of Samuel Pepys for 31 December 1661: "I sat down to end my journell for this year, ...", which is immediately followed by an entry dated "1 January 1661/62". This is an example of the dual dating system which had become common at the time.) as well as legal and common usage in Scotland (since 1600) and most of Europe, was to begin the year on 1 January. Accordingly, the act provided that "all His Majesty's Dominions" would cease this tradition from the end of December 1751, such that the following day would be 1 January 1752.
- It acknowledges that the Julian calendar still in use in Great Britain and its Dominions had been found to be inaccurate, and that most of Europe had already adopted an (unnamed) revised calendar. The Julian calendar was eleven days behind this 'New Style' calendar. With this Act, therefore, Britain implicitly adopted the Gregorian calendar. To do so, it ordered that eleven calendar days be skipped (Note: ... "that the natural next day immediately following the said second of September [1752] shall be called, reckoned and accounted to be the fourteenth day of September, omitting for that time only the eleven intermediate nominal days of the common calendar; and that the several natural days, which shall follow and succeed next after the said fourteenth day of September, shall be respectively called, reckoned and numbered forwards in numerical order from the said fourteenth day of September, according to the order and succession of days now used in the present calendar" ...) in September 1752 and that centennial years no longer be leap years unless divisible by 400.
- An annexe to the act gives a method to calculate the dates of Easter by varying slightly the traditional method of the Church of England (rather than by adopting the method of Pope Gregory XIII).

The act also provides that fixed religious feast days continue to be observed on the same calendar date, whereas movable feasts (whose dates depend on the date of Easter) would follow from the new rules for its calculation. Religious feast days were to be held to their nominal dates (for example Michaelmas, on 29 September), but the act also requires that the dates of 'fairs and marts' traditionally associated with those feasts (but in reality tied to the seasons), be moved in the calendar by discounting eleven days. Thus, for example, the Michaelmas hiring and mop fairs moved to 10 October and became known as Old Michaelmas Day. Christmas Day was still celebrated on 25 December and an 'Old Christmas' was not formalised: nevertheless, some communities were reluctant to accept the change.

The act includes various measures to prevent injustice and other problems. For example, Section VI, echoing a rule in Gregory's reform, provides that the date on which rents and other debts are due must be deferred by 11 days. In addition, the same Section says a person does not reach a particular age, including especially the age of majority (21), until the complete number of years have passed.

In addition, the act finally settles the position of leap day in English law as 29 February. (Note: Some authorities had continued to follow the Roman calendar method of inserting the leap day between 24 February and 25 February, then ignoring it for legal purposes. Henry III of England's Statute De Anno et Die Bissextili (Statute concerning [the] leap year and leap day) of 1236 instructed magistrates to ignore the leap day when persons were being ordered to appear before the court within a year. The famous lawyer Sir Edward Coke (1552–1634) cites it in his Institutes of the Lawes of England.)

== Background and context ==
=== New Year's Day ===
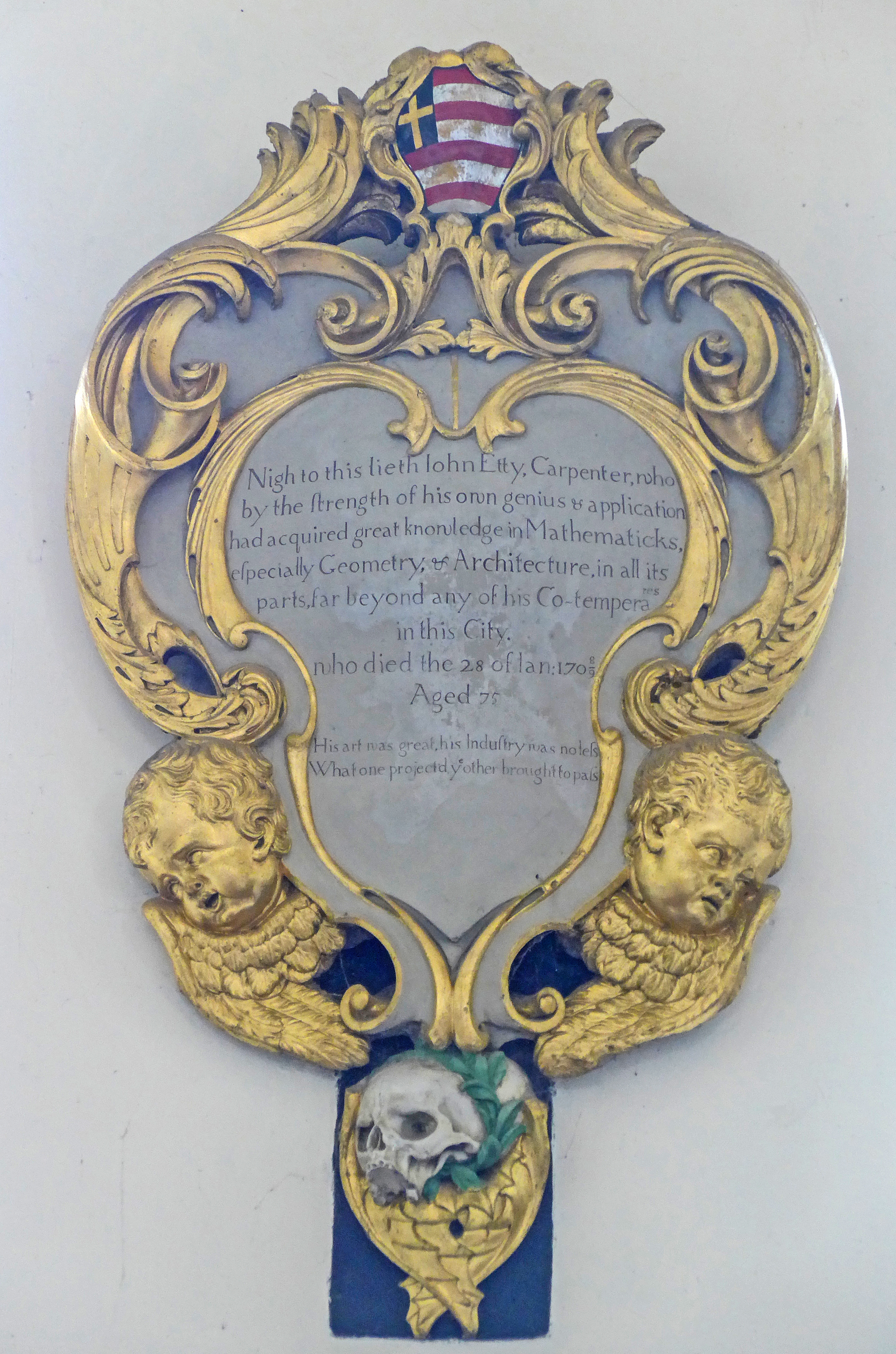
A memorial plaque. (Note: The memorial is to a John Etty and is in All Saints' Church, North Street, York) The date of death is given as 28 January 170 8/9

By the 18th century, the English legal year – used for legal, financial and other civil purposes – had for centuries begun on 25 March, or Lady Day. (Note: 25 March is the Feast of the Annunciation: Christians believe that this is the moment when Jesus was conceived.) Thus, for example, 24 March 1707 was immediately followed by 25 March 1708, while the day following 31 December 1708 was 1 January 1708, with 1709 still nearly three months away. The introduction to the act states succinctly the rationale for a change to the start of the year in England (and Wales) to 1 January: the March date had been found to have many inconveniences. It differed from the date (1 January) used by Scotland, which had ceased to use 25 March in 1600, as well as that used by other neighbouring countries and ordinary people throughout the kingdom. As a consequence, it says, frequent mistakes were made in the dates of deeds and other writings. (Note: For example, between 25 March and 31 December 1719 inclusive, the dates under the two systems for beginning the year are the same. But dates falling between 1 January and 24 March inclusive are not: 2 February 1719 in the year beginning 25 March 1719 (as in England) is the same day as 2 February 1720 in a year beginning on 1 January (as in Scotland).)

In The Twelve Caesars, Suetonius wrote that the Julian calendar, introduced by Julius Caesar in 45 BC as consul, continued the old Roman practice of beginning the year with 1 January. Later Christians, however, felt that 1 January had no religious significance and wanted to begin the year on a more appropriate date, resulting in a great variety of dates being used during the medieval period. No civil legislation or religious canon law ordered this change, but Christmas Day on 25 December gradually became a popular date for New Year in England from the 6th century, though this custom fell almost entirely out of use by the beginning of the 14th century. It is not wholly clear why 25 March came to be settled on as the beginning of the legal year instead, though it saw use in Aquitaine during the 10th century and Normandy by the 11th (shortly before the Norman Conquest). The 11th century also saw dedications to the Virgin Mary go from being rare in England to the most frequent, signifying the increasing importance of Lady Day in the liturgical year. (Note: England was by no means unique in this phenomenon, with the legal calendar being functionally identical to the Florentine calendar (ignoring Florence's unusual system whereby the day began at sunset), while the Pisan calendar also began on 25 March, but ran ahead of the Roman calendar rather than behind, resulting in it always being one year in front of that of England. This is in contrast to the Venetian calendar beginning on 1 March, and the French calendar which began on Easter Day.) Despite being commonplace by the middle of the 12th century, however, it then gave way to the invariable use of the regnal year for legal records from the reign of Henry II, though its legal status was cemented by its use in official parliamentary records from the 16th century onwards. From the 13th century, there also arose the curious phenomenon of New Year's Day being almost universally celebrated on 1 January, despite the recorded year not incrementing until 25 March.

However, it was the continuation of the Roman calendar layout beginning with January that eventually led European countries in the 16th century to return to a legal year that started on 1 January: for example the Venetian Republic (1522, sixty years before the Gregorian reform), France (1564) and Scotland (1600). By 1750 most of Europe had already made this change and the continuing English practice became a source of confusion for English merchants and diplomats and their counterparts, when dealing across the Channel or with Scotland. An informal system of 'dual dating' had developed to help reduce confusion. For example, a date written as 21 January 1719/20 (or 17 19/20) means both a date of 21 January 1719 (where the year began ten months earlier, on 25 March 1719, as in England) and a date of 21 January 1720 (where the year began three weeks earlier, on 1 January 1720, as in Scotland). These notations both refer to the same day in the real world. The Calendar (New Style) Act 1750 removed this difficulty by changing the start of the year to 1 January for England and Wales and the colonies. (Note: The choice of the start of the year was a separate issue from the choice of calendar. Scotland changed to a 1 January start in 1600 but continued to use the Julian calendar for another 152 years. Until 1752, England kept a 25 March start and also used the Julian calendar. The applicability of the act to Ireland and the Isle of Man is discussed below.) The change applied "after the last day of December 1751". (Note: This form of words was required because, absent the act, the next day – 1 January – would also be 1751.) The legal year which began on 25 March 1751 became a short year of 282 days, running from 25 March 1751 to 31 December 1751. The following year began as 1 January 1752 (New Style).

=== The eleven day shift ===
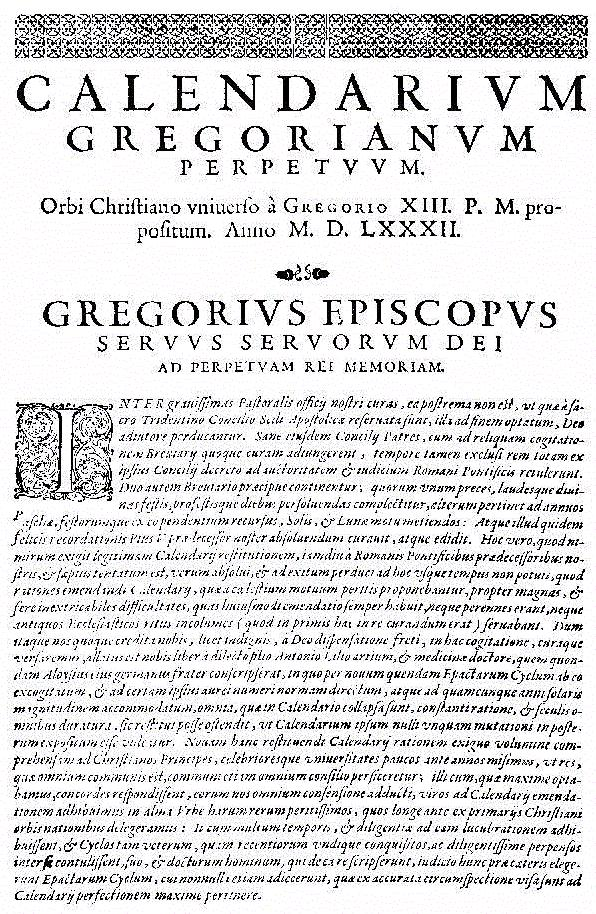
First page of the papal bull Inter gravissimas ("Among the most serious ...")

The reason given to discard both the traditional calendar and the eleven-day accumulated difference was a religious one: calculation of the date of Easter. The introduction to the act explains that, due to the inaccuracy in the Julian calendar, the date of the spring equinox (which determines the date of Easter) had drifted by about eleven days from its date at the time of the First Council of Nicaea, 21 March, (Note: The act gives the name of this Council as "Nice", which is the nomenclature used by Edward Gibbon throughout his The History of the Decline and Fall of the Roman Empire) and that this drift would continue unless the calendar was corrected and the eleven days' difference deleted.

The Gregorian calendar was a reform of the Julian calendar, instituted by Pope Gregory XIII in 1582 by the papal bull "Inter gravissimas" ("Among the most serious"). The intention expressed by the text of this bull was to reset the calendar so that celestial events critical for the calculation of Easter dates – the March equinox and its adjacent full moons – would be back in what the bull calls "their proper places" and would be prevented from being moved away again.

The divergence had happened because the Julian calendar adds a leap year every four years, but this process adds about three more days every four hundred years than the Earth's orbit requires. More precisely, newer measurements had found that a 'tropical year' (an orbit of the Earth around the Sun) was taking some twelve minutes less than the 365 days and 6 hours that had been assumed for the Julian Calendar.

By 1582, some ten too many leap days had therefore been added into the calendar by virtue of the 'unnecessary' leap years in the Julian Calendar – meaning that the calendar date of the observed spring equinox had, over some 15 centuries, drifted from its 'rightful' position of 21 March to 11 March. (Note: Because 1600 was a leap year according to both calendars, the accumulated error reached eleven days (not twelve) by 1750, due to the Julian-only leap year in 1700) Gregory's reform removed the ten 'additional' leap days that had been added to the Julian calendar since Nicaea, thus resetting what appeared to be 11 March back to its 'rightful' calendar date of 21 March to coincide with the observed equinox.

The reform also provided a new method for calculating leap years so that the error would not recur. Under the Julian calendar a leap year fell every four years when the year was evenly divisible by four. The second part of Gregory's change declared that a centennial year would not be a leap year unless it was further evenly divisible by 400: Section II of the act replicates this algorithm. By 1750, almost all countries in Western Christendom except Britain and its empire had already adopted Gregory's reform.

According to Gregory's rule, the year 1600 was a leap year, but 1700 was not – but it remained a leap year under the Julian calendar. This meant that when Britain reformed the calendar in the 1750s, the divergence between the calendars had reached eleven days. Section I of the act corrects this divergence by providing that Wednesday, 2 September 1752 be followed by Thursday, 14 September 1752.

=== Calculation of the date of Easter: the Computus ===
The Annex to the act gives the algorithm (formally, 'the Computus') to be used thereafter in the Church of England's Book of Common Prayer to establish the date of Easter: this replaced the previous rules used by the Church. However, with the potential for religious strife in mind, the promoters of the Bill downplayed the Roman Catholic connection. The Parliamentary drafters of the act, and of the associated text to revise the Book of Common Prayer, were careful to minimise the impact on religious sensitivities by expressing the revision in terms consistent with the traditional method of the Church of England. They had reason to be cautious: the Government of Elizabeth I had first attempted to reform the calendar in 1583/1584, but the Anglican hierarchy of the day rejected the proposal because of its Popish origins. Again, when Sir Isaac Newton renewed the campaign to correct the calendar in 1699, his proposal foundered on doctrinal objections. The Annex established a computation for the date of Easter that achieved the same result as Gregory's rules, without actually referring to him. The algorithm, set out in the Book of Common Prayer as required by the act, includes calculation of the Golden Number and the Sunday Letter needed for the Anglican method. The Annex includes the definition: "Easter-day (on which the rest depend) is always the first Sunday after the Full Moon, which happens upon, or next after the Twenty-first Day of March. And if the Full Moon happens upon a Sunday, Easter-day is the Sunday after". The Annexe uses the terms 'Paschal Full Moon' and 'Ecclesiastical Full Moon', making it clear that they only approximate to the real full moon.

In his The Book of Almanacs (1851) Augustus De Morgan (Professor of Mathematics at University College London), commented on the definition of Easter in the Calendar (New Style) Act 1750. He noted that the body of the act wrongly stated the way Easter was calculated, but that the annexed Tables correctly set out the dates for Easter as prescribed by Pope Gregory.

=== Leap day ===
Until the 1662 edition of the Book of Common Prayer, England followed the practice of the early Julian calendar period of creating a leap day by having two successive days, both numbered 24 February. The Book of Common Prayer (1662) included a calendar which used entirely consecutive day counting and showed leap day as falling on 29 February.

Section II of the Calendar (New Style) Act contains the new Gregorian rule for determining leap years in the future and also makes it quite clear that leap years contain 366 days. (Note: "... shall for the future, and in all Times to come, be esteemed and taken to be Bissextile or Leap Years, consisting of three hundred and sixty six Days, in the same Sort and Manner as is now used with respect to every fourth Year of Our Lord".) In addition, the calendar at the end of this Act confirms that leap day falls on 29 February.

== Passage through Parliament ==
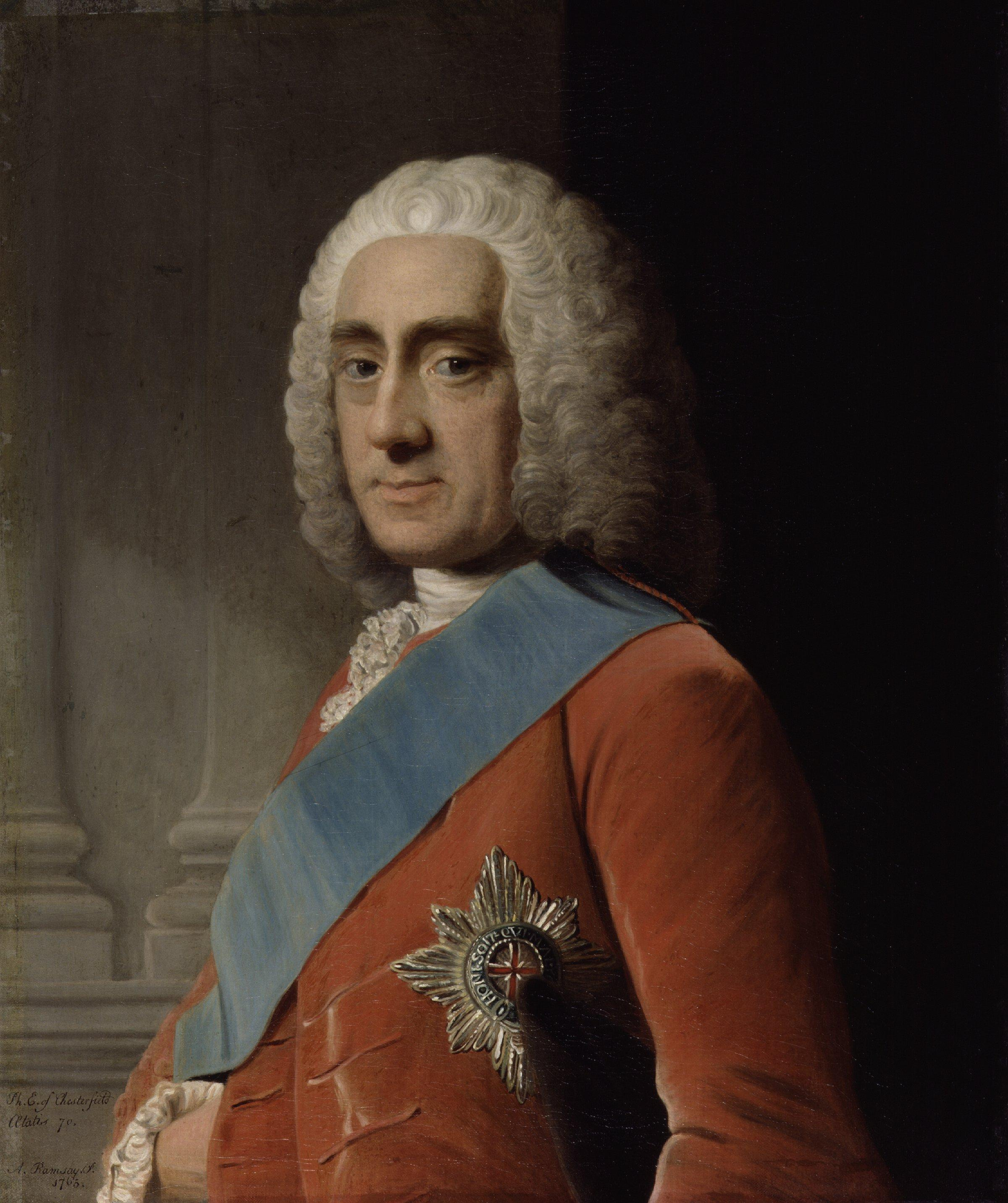
Portrait of Lord Chesterfield

Today, a major reform of this kind would be a government bill, but this was a private member's bill, proposed in the House of Lords on 25 February 1750 [8 March 1751 Gregorian] by Philip Stanhope, 4th Earl of Chesterfield. The proposition was seconded in detail by George Parker, 2nd Earl of Macclesfield, whom Chesterfield described as one of the greatest mathematicians and astronomers in Europe. (Note: Macclesfield was later to become President of the Royal Society (1752–1764)) Macclesfield had contributed the technical knowledge underlying the reform with support from Martin Folkes (then president of the Royal Society) and James Bradley (the astronomer royal). Bradley devised the revised Easter tables. Peter Davall, a barrister of the Middle Temple, who was also an astronomer and formerly secretary to the Royal Society, drafted the Bill. The prime minister the Duke of Newcastle, opposed the bill (because he "did not love new-fangled things") and asked Chesterfield to abandon it, but the government did not block it and the bill passed in the Lords without further debate.

The House of Commons passed the bill on 13 May [24 May N.S.] 1751; it received royal assent on 22 May [2 June N.S.] 1751.

=== Title of the act ===
The title of the act is: An Act for regulating the Commencement of the Year, and for correcting the Calendar now in Use.

It was not the practice in the 18th century to give short titles to acts of Parliament. The old long titles had proved increasingly inconvenient, (Note: For example, when it became necessary to amend this act, the title of the act to do so is "An Act to amend an Act made in the last Session of Parliament, (intituled, An Act for regulating the Commencement of the Year, and for correcting the Calendar now in Use)", with the session of the amended act given in the marginal note to the preamble.) and it became the custom to refer to acts by informal popular names. The Short Titles Act 1896 retrospectively gave short titles to old statutes that had not been repealed. In particular, the 1896 act conferred the short title Calendar (New Style) Act 1750 on this act.

=== Date of the act ===
It may seem strange to modern readers that the Calendar (New Style) Act has the date of 1750 when royal assent was given on 22 May 1751. The reason is that, before the Acts of Parliament (Commencement) Act 1793 (33 Geo. 3. c. 13), the date on which a bill became law was the first day of the parliamentary session in which it was passed, unless the act contained a provision to the contrary.

The calendar reform bill was introduced in the session which began on 17 January 1750 Old Style [N.S. 28 January 1751], almost nine months into a year that had begun on 25 March 1750. Hence the Short Titles Act 1896 assigned the calendar reform to 1750.

=== Commencement ===
As declared in section 1 of the act, the law came into effect "from and after the last Day of December 1751", (Note: As explained at History of taxation in the United Kingdom#Legal rule, the word from was used in legislation at the time to exclude the date given.) which thereafter was deemed to be 1 January 1752.

== Territorial extent of the act ==
The act applied to those countries and dominions in Europe, Asia, Africa, and America that belonged or were subject to the crown of Great Britain.

=== Wales ===
After the conquest of Wales by Edward I of England, English law was increasingly applied. Various acts passed by the Parliament of England between 1535 and 1542 consolidated the combination of England and Wales as a single jurisdiction. Nevertheless, before the Wales and Berwick Act 1746 it was often uncertain whether a reference to 'England' in legislation of the London Parliament included Wales. The 1746 act provided that in all legislation, past and future, the word 'England' was deemed to include Wales and thus the Calendar (New Style) Act 1750 (four years later) applied to Wales, despite it not being named explicitly. (Note: The Wales and Berwick Act 1746 was repealed by the Welsh Language Act 1967 for the future but not the past. From 1967, legislation refers to 'England', 'Wales' or 'England and Wales' as appropriate.)

=== Scotland ===
The Kingis Majestie and Lordis of His Secreit Counsall undirstanding that in all utheris weill governit commoun welthis and cuntreyis the first day of the yeir begynis yeirlie upoun the first day of Januare commonlie callit New Yearis Day and that this realme onlie is different fra all utheris in the compt and reckining of the yeiris: ... (Note: This text, written in Scots, may be roughly translated as His Majesty the King and the Lords of his Privy Council, understanding that in all other well-governed commonwealths and countries the first day of the year begins yearly on the first day of January commonly called New Year's Day and that this Realm is different from all the others in the account and reckoning of the years: ...) — Ex Regist, Secr. conc. in Archivis Publicis Scotiae.

As part of the Kingdom of Great Britain since the Acts of Union 1707, the act applied equally to Scotland as to England. Scotland had already made part of the change: its calendar year had begun on 1 January since 1600. The example of Continental countries prompted King James VI of Scotland and his council to make the change, as the Register of the Scottish Privy Council of 17 December 1599 records.

=== Ireland ===
Calendar Act 1781 (Republic of Ireland) (Note: Short title given by Short Titles Act 1962 (No. 5)); Short title given by Short Titles Act (Northern Ireland) 1951 (c. 1 (N.I.)) (United Kingdom)
- Act of Parliament
- Parliament of Ireland
- Long title: An Act for extending certain of the Provisions, contained in an Act, entitled, "An Act confirming all the Statutes made in England."
- Citation: 21 & 22 Geo. 3. c. 48 (I)
- Territorial extent: Ireland

Dates
- Royal assent: 27 July 1782
- Commencement: 9 October 1781 (Note: Start of session.)
Other legislation
Amended by	Promissory Oaths Act 1871; Statute Law Revision (Ireland) Act 1879; Statute Law (Repeals) Act 1973
Relates to	Poynings' Law 1495

Status: Partially repealed

Text of statute as originally enacted

Text of the Yelverton's Act (Ireland) 1781 [I] as in force today (including any amendments) within the United Kingdom, from legislation.gov.uk.

At the time, the Kingdom of Ireland was a semi-autonomous kingdom in a personal union with the Kingdom of Great Britain. The Declaratory Act 1719 (6 Geo. 1. c. 5) asserted that the Parliament of Great Britain had the right to legislate for Ireland, which was one of His Majesty's Dominions. Nevertheless, in 1782, the Parliament of Ireland enacted a statute, the Calendar Act 1781 (21 & 22 Geo. 3. c. 48 (I)), to confirm the application of the 1750 act to Ireland. Whatever the de jure status of the British Act in Ireland, it was applied immediately de facto, as recorded in the ready reckoner printed in Faulkner's Dublin Journal for 1752.

=== Isle of Man ===
In January 1753, Tynwald, the Isle of Man's legislature, passed an act for regulating the commencement of the year, and for establishing the new calendar now used in England, now referred to as the Gregorian Calendar Act 1753. The act recited that the island had observed the calendar established by the British act since 1 January 1752 and made provision in similar terms to the British act. The act was promulgated and became law, with retrospective effect, on 5 July 1753. One of its permanent effects was to postpone the holding of the annual sitting of Tynwald at St John's, at which acts of Tynwald were and still are promulgated, from 24 June (the feast of St John the Baptist) to 5 July.

=== America ===
The Calendar (New Style) Act 1750 applied to Britain's American colonies: the north-eastern states of the present day United States and part of Canada. Some British law, including the 1750 act, is still applicable in some US states because when American independence was declared in 1776, it was not practical for these former colonies to create an entirely new body of American law to replace British law. The practical solution adopted was to continue to apply British law as it stood in 1776 but subject to the proviso that it could be overridden by any subsequent provision of American law, and did not conflict with the Constitution and laws of the United States.

James Bryan Whitfield, a former Florida Supreme Court judge, together with others, produced a comprehensive list of the relevant measures in 1941. This built on earlier work by Missouri. The list includes the key part of the Calendar (New Style) Act 1750.

Some states adopted as their common law the laws of England as it was in 1607, predating the 1750 act.

There is no US federal calendar law.

The act remains directly in force in Canada as part of Canadian law.

=== Other former British colonies ===
The act applies directly or indirectly in other former British colonies.

Early Australian colonial legislation applied British law. Subsequently, various reviews have considered the relevance of old British statutes. Australian States eventually repealed British statutes but re-enacted those which remained relevant, such as the Calendar (New Style) Act 1750. For example, New South Wales passed the Imperial Acts Application Act 1969, the First Schedule of which repeals various British statutes including the Calendar (New Style) Act 1750. At the same time Section 16 continues the operation of the British Calendar Act by restating key parts and by referring to that Act for the details.

New Zealand also passed early legislation at various times applying British law. In 1988, New Zealand enacted the Imperial Laws Application Act 1988, which disapplied all but a limited schedule of English Acts it declared to be "part of the laws of New Zealand", one of which is the Calendar (New Style) Act 1750.

=== Asia and Africa ===
Britain had by this time begun colonising India and parts of Africa – hence the references to Asia and Africa.

=== Europe ===
Apart from Great Britain and Ireland, the only part of Europe under effective British sovereignty was Gibraltar. However, each session of Parliament began with a recital that the King was also the rightful King of France. (Note: Latin: Anno Regni GEORGII II Regis Magnæ Britannie Franciæ & Hiberniæ vicesimo quarto transl. The twenty-fourth year of the reign of George II, Great King of Britain, France and Ireland)

== Reaction and effect ==
=== "Give us our eleven days!" – the calendar riot myth ===
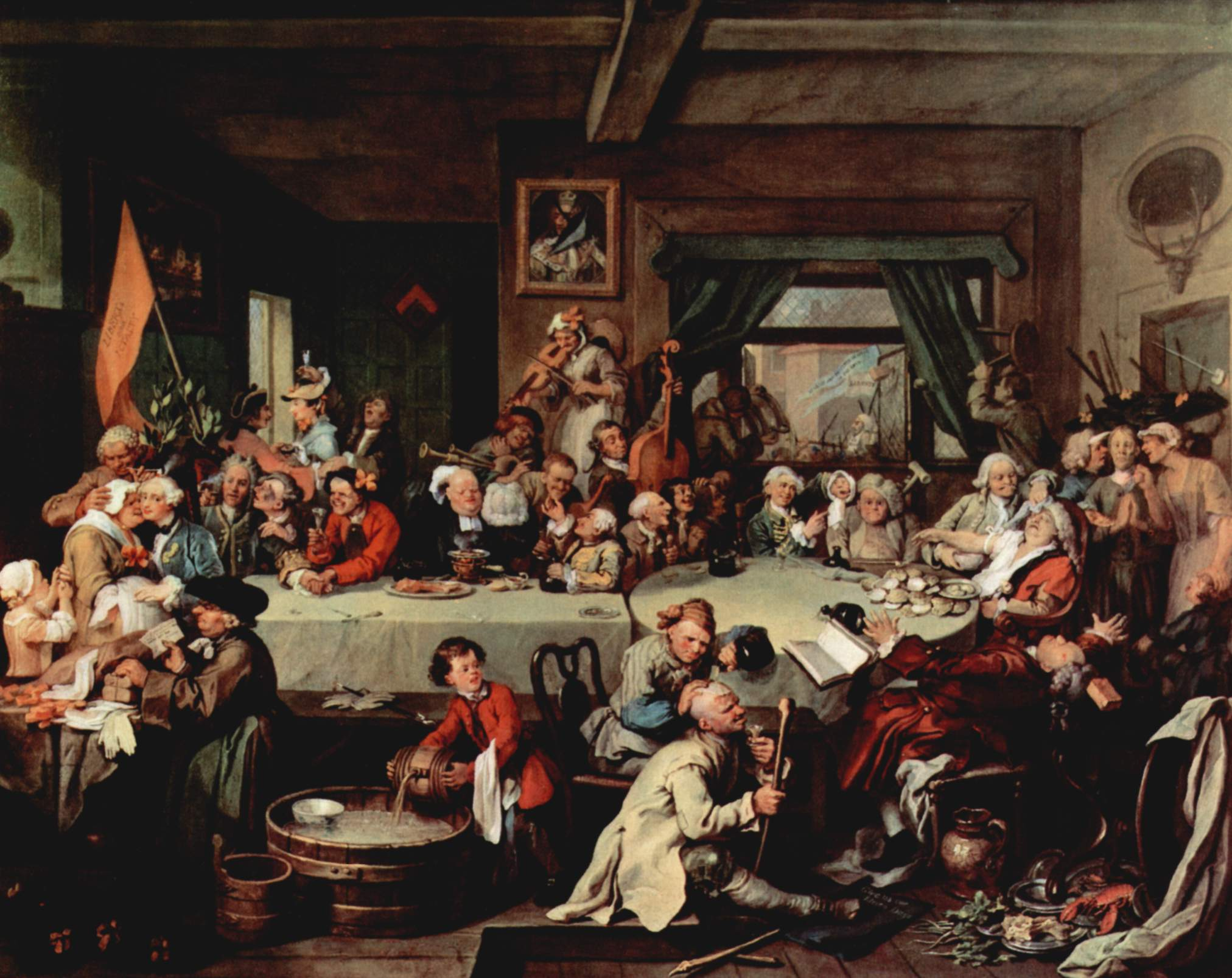
An Election Entertainment (c. 1755), a painting by William Hogarth, which is the main source for "Give us our Eleven Days".

... and that the natural Day next immediately following the said 2nd Day of September, shall be called, reckoned and accounted to be the 14th Day of September, omitting for that Time only the 11 intermediate nominal Days of the common Calendar; — Calendar (New Style) Act 1750, Section 1

Some history books report rioting in reaction to the calendar change, with people demanding that their 'eleven days' be returned. However, this is very likely a myth, based on just two primary sources—The World, a satirical journal of Lord Chesterfield, and An Election Entertainment, a painting by the satirist William Hogarth. There are no contemporary records of any such events in the riot depositions at the Public Record Office.

This is the same Lord Chesterfield who introduced the Bill to the House of Lords. He wrote to his son (without saying which 'numerous assembly' he had in mind), "Every numerous assembly is a mob, let the individuals who compose it be what they will. Mere sense is never to be talked to a mob; their passions, their sentiments, their senses and their seeming interests alone are to be applied to. Understanding have they collectively none."

When the son of the Earl of Macclesfield (who had been influential in passing the act) stood for Parliament in Oxfordshire as a Whig in 1754, dissatisfaction with the calendar reform was one of a number of issues raised by his Tory opponents. In 1755, Hogarth produced a painting (and an engraved print from the painting) loosely based on these elections, entitled An Election Entertainment, which shows a placard carrying the slogan "Give us our Eleven Days" (on the floor, lower right). In his book Hogarth, His Life, Art and Times (1993), Ronald Paulson says of the picture that "the Oxfordshire people ... are specifically rioting, as historically the London crowd did, to preserve the 'Eleven Days' the government stole from them in September 1752 by changing the calendar". (Note: Paulson does not provide any supporting evidence for either of these 'riots'.)

Thus, the 'calendar riot' fiction was born. The election campaign depicted concluded in 1754, after a very lengthy contest between Court Whigs and Jacobite Tories. Every issue between the two factions was brought up, including the question of calendar reform. The Tories attacked the Whigs for every deviation, including their alleged favouritism towards foreign Jews and the 'Popish' calendar. Hogarth's placard, part of a satire on the character of the debate, was not an observation of actual crowd behaviour.

=== Financial concerns ===
Three Market Days unto the Farmer's lost,
Yet three per Cent, is added to his Cost:
The Landlord calls for Rent before 'tis due,
King's Tax, and Windows, Poor, and Parson too;
With Numbers more, our Grandsiers never knew.
Domestick Servants all will have their Pay,
And force their Masters e're the Quarter Day.

How shall the Wretch, then glean his Harvest in,
His Cash expended e're he does begin;...
Or how the Miser cram his Bags with Pelf,
If that he don't receive it first himself?

— True Briton, Bristol, 20 September 1752 (Note: Poole adds a comment that, "The end-point of a rather tortuous argument was that the abatements should have been greater. The journal adopted the New Style and supported the reform, pointing out only that the Gregorian calendar was still slightly inaccurate".)

There were, however, legitimate concerns lest tax and other payments arise any earlier under the new calendar than they would otherwise have done. Consequently, Provision 6 of the act ('Times of Payment of Rents, Annuities') stipulated that monthly, quarterly or yearly payments would not become due until the days that originally they would have done had the Julian calendar continued—that is, due dates were deferred by eleven days.

The Earl of Macclesfield, in his speech to the House of Lords during the passage of the Bill, said a proportionate reduction in payments had been considered as an alternative solution. That is, maintaining the original payment dates but reducing the amounts due proportionately to reflect the omission of eleven days from the quarter ending on 29 September 1752 (Michaelmas Day). Macclesfield said this idea was abandoned because it would prove more complex than it first appeared. Despite this, the Treasury later considered legislating to override the Calendar (New Style) Act 1750 provisions by applying proportionate reductions to government payments of interest, salaries and wages, but the idea was abandoned. Nevertheless, the Treasury realised that outside government a proportionate reduction of wages, rents etc. for the short quarter might be convenient in some cases. Robert Poole writes that the Treasury "decided that a tidy move to new-style quarter day payments might gradually be achieved at the point where old leases expired and new ones began. Tables of abatements ... for the eleven missing days were included in the official information about the changeover and widely published in the press, almanacs and pocket books". The True Briton newspaper of 20 September 1752 reported that the reduction in servant's wages (according to the official guide) was 7d for each pound but that another source had calculated the rate as 7 1/4d. (Note: A Farthing (1/4d) at the time was not insignificant.)

=== Religious dissent ===
As already observed, the authors of the act were careful to minimise the impact on religious sensitivities by expressing the revision in terms consistent with the traditions of the established Church of England, given the experience of previous attempts. By the middle of the 18th century, however, it seems that the climate had changed somewhat. The traditional saints' days like Lady Day, Michaelmas and Martinmas had come to mark events in the civil calendar such as fair days, rent days and hiring days far more than they did days of special religious observance. Poole writes, "The religious calendar of the established church continued, but it encompassed a shrinking proportion of the population as Dissent expanded at the expense of Anglicanism, and as parish wakes, feasts and saints' days were themselves disowned by many parish clergy." So the act explicitly exempted fairs and marts from the calendar reform; "that is, they were to change their nominal date to retain the same place in the season, thus in effect observing the Old Style".

The revision to the Book of Common Prayer setting the new basis for calculating the date for Easter (and its associated events like Lent) appears to have passed without public controversy – "perhaps", Poole remarks, "because few people understood how Easter worked anyway". The date of Christmas, however, proved to be a different matter. The Gentleman's Magazine and Historical Chronicle, 23 January 1753, reported that a "vast concourse of people" in Somerset gathered at the (Christmas-flowering) Glastonbury thorn on 24 December 1752 (New Style) to test the authenticity of the new date. "[B]ut to their great disappointment, there was no appearance of its blowing, which made them watch it narrowly the 5th of Jan. the Christmas-Day, Old-Stile, when it blow'd as usual." The vicar of Glastonbury, however, later announced that it had in fact flowered nearer New Christmas Day. William Dawson (1902) writes a Reverend Francis Blackburne opened his church on Friday, 5 January 1753 – (O.S., 25 December 1752) – to a congregation which filled the building. "The people were sorely disappointed, however, when the rector did not use the service designated for Christmas Day but instead, like a crusading clergyman of the twentieth century, preached a sermon on the virtue of obeying the Calendar Act."

== Amendments ==
=== Calendar Act 1751 ===
Calendar Act 1751
- Act of Parliament
- Parliament of Great Britain
- Long title: An Act to amend an Act made in the last Session of Parliament, intituled, "An Act for regulating the Commencement of the Year, and for correcting the Calendar now in Use."
- Citation: 25 Geo. 2. c. 30
- Territorial extent: England and Wales; Scotland

Dates
- Royal assent: 26 March 1752
- Commencement: 14 November 1751
Other legislation
Amends	Michaelmas Term Act 1750
Amended by	Statute Law Revision Act 1867; Statute Law Revision Act 1888; Short Titles Act 1896; Supreme Court of Judicature (Consolidation) Act 1925; City of London (Various Powers) Act 1959
Relates to	Calendar (New Style) Act 1750; Easter Act 1928

Status: Amended

Text of statute as originally enacted

Text of the Calendar Act 1751 as in force today (including any amendments) within the United Kingdom, from legislation.gov.uk.

The Calendar Act 1751 (25 Geo. 2. c. 30) was needed to rectify some unforeseen consequences of the Calendar (New Style) Act 1750.

Section I of the 1751 act concerned the legal validity of actions that were due to be executed on the omitted eleven days, 3 September to 13 September 1752. The act provided that for 1752 only, those actions would be deemed to be lawful and to have effect on "the same natural days" as if the reform had not taken place.

Section II of the act addressed calendar dates associated with the opening of common land, the payment of rents, and other matters. Such legal acts as were governed by the dates of movable feasts would thenceforth conform to the dates of those feasts in the revised calendar.

Section III of the act provided that nothing should abridge, extend, or alter the titles of land.

Section IV of the act resolved the date for electing the Mayor of the City of London and also revised the Michaelmas Term Act 1750 (24 Geo. 2. c.48), an unrelated act that had shortened the Michaelmas term.

=== Cattle Distemper, Vagrancy, Marshalsea Prison, etc. Act 1753 (26 Geo. 2. c. 34) ===
Cattle Distemper, Vagrancy, Marshalsea Prison, etc. Act 1753
- Act of Parliament
- Parliament of Great Britain
- Long title: An Act to explain, amend, and continue, several Laws, more effectually to prevent the spreading of the Distemper which now rages amongst the Horned Cattle in this Kingdom; for the more effectual paying the Expenses of passing Vagrants; for obviating Doubts that may arise, touching the keeping of Prisoners until the Prison of The Marshalsea of the Court of King's Bench shall be re-built or re-paired; and for amending so much of the act of the Twenty-fourth of His present Majesty, for regulating the Commencement of the Year, and for correcting the Calendar now in Use, as relates to the Time of electing publick Officers of the City of Chester.
- Citation: 26 Geo. 2. c. 34
- Territorial extent: Great Britain

Dates
- Royal assent: 7 June 1753
- Commencement: 11 January 1753
- Repealed: 18 December 1953
Other legislation
Amends	Justices Commitment Act 1743; Distemper Amongst Cattle Act 1745; Distemper Amongst Cattle Act 1746; Insolvent Debtors Relief, etc. Act 1747; Continuance of Laws, etc. Act 1748; Distemper Amongst Cattle Act 1749; Calendar (New Style) Act 1750; Distemper Among Cattle Act 1750; Distemper Amongst Cattle Act 1751
Repealed by	Statute Law Revision Act 1867; Statute Law Revision Act 1953

Status: Repealed

Text of statute as originally enacted

A similar issue was identified shortly afterwards with the date of the "annual election of mayor, sheriffs, treasurers, coroners, and leave-lookers" in Chester "to avoid the inconvenience which would arise to the citizens, from the alteration of the style bringing the ancient day of election into the fair week." The issue was resolved by appending a clause to an otherwise irrelevant act, the Cattle Distemper, Vagrancy, Marshalsea Prison, etc. Act 1753 (26 Geo. 2. c. 34), (Note: This act has no short title, being known simply by its citation, '26 Geo. 2. c. 34', or by its long title – "An act to amend an act made in the last session of parliament intituled An Act to explain, amend, and continue, several Laws, more effectually to prevent the spreading of the Distemper which now rages amongst the Horned Cattle in this Kingdom; for the more effectual paying the Expenses of passing Vagrants; for obviating Doubts that may arise, touching the keeping of Prisoners until the Prison of The Marshalsea of the Court of King's Bench shall be re-built or re-paired; and for amending so much of the act of the Twenty-fourth of His present Majesty, for regulating the Commencement of the Year, and for correcting the Calendar now in Use, as relates to the Time of electing publick Officers of the City of Chester.") to move its statutory date forward by a week.

=== Anniversary Days Observance Act 1859 ===
Section III of the Calendar (New Style) Act 1750 required the observation of certain days of political or religious significance. These are listed in a Table headed "Certain Solemn Days for which particular [church] Services are appointed" and are: 5 November (the Gunpowder Plot); 30 January (Execution of Charles I); and 29 May (The Restoration).

As part of the development of religious and political toleration, Section I of the Anniversary Days Observance Act 1859 removed from various Acts, including the Calendar Act, the obligation to commemorate these days with special church services.

=== Easter Act 1928 ===
The Easter Act 1928 was enacted to permit the date of Easter (as observed by the established church) to be fixed permanently, as the first Sunday after the second Saturday in April. An Order in Council is needed for this Act to come into force and no such order has been made. If so ordered, the 1928 Act would replace the table of "Moveable and Immoveable Feasts" in the Calendar (New Style) Act 1750.

=== Statute Law Revision Act 1948 ===
The Statute Law Revision Act 1948 (11 & 12 Geo. 6. c. 62) simplified and removed some redundant words from Section VI of the Calendar (New Style) Act 1750, including the reference to the time at which the age of 21, or any other age, is reached. The provision about age could only affect those alive at the time of calendar reform. The 1948 Act also repealed the "Table to find Easter till the Year 1899 inclusive" and the "Table of the Moveable Feasts for Fifty two years". By 1948 these tables had ceased to be relevant and this Act deleted them.

=== Statute Law (Repeals) Act 1971 ===
The calendar included in the Calendar (New Style) Act 1750 is headed "The Calendar, with the Table of Lessons". For each month the morning and evening prayers are specified. The Statute Law (Repeals) Act 1971 removed the words "with the Table of Lessons" and also all the specified prayers in the Table. The changes followed a Law Commission Report and reflected the views of the Church.

=== Statute Law (Repeals) Act 1986 ===
Section IV of the Calendar (New Style) Act 1750 has provisions about the dates for meetings of courts in Scotland. These were repealed by the Statute Law (Repeals) Act 1986, following a report by the Law Commission and the Scottish Law Commission.

== Consequences for income tax year ==
The act predates the introduction of income tax in 1799, so it had no direct effect. In his 1995 paper on the calendar reform, Robert Poole cites the Treasury Board Papers at the National Archives and explains that, after the omission of eleven days in September 1752, the national accounts carried on being drawn up to the same four quarter days as usual but their dates were moved on by eleven days "so that financial transactions should run their full natural term" (and thus Lady Day on 25 March Old Style became 5 April New Style).

== See also ==
- Old Style and New Style dates
- cal (command)#Quirks (1752)

== Bibliography ==
- Bond, John James (1875). Handy Book of Rules and Tables for Verifying Dates With the Christian Era Giving an Account of the Chief Eras and Systems Used by Various Nations...' (4th ed.). London: George Bell & Sons.
- Pickering, Danby, ed. (1765). The Statutes at Large: from the 23rd to the 26th Year of King George II. Vol. 20. Cambridge: Charles Bathurst. (This is the original 1750/51 Act, in facsimile image. For clearer text, with long s (ſ) converted to modern s, see British Calendar Act of 1751, the original text of the act in plain text (ASCII), from Wikisource.)
- C R Cheney, ed. (2000) [1945]. A Handbook of Dates for students of British History. Revised by Michael Jones. Cambridge: Cambridge University Press. ISBN 9780521778459.
- Poole, Robert (1995). "'Give us our eleven days!': calendar reform in eighteenth-century England". Past & Present (149). Oxford Academic: 95–139. doi:10.1093/past/149.1.95. JSTOR 651100. Archived from the original on 29 October 2020.
- Pollard, A. F. (1940). "'New Year's Day and Leap Year in English History'". The English Historical Review. 55 (218). Oxford University Press: 177–193. doi:10.1093/ehr/lv.ccxviii.177. JSTOR 553864. Archived from the original on 2 February 2021.
- Poole, Reginald L. (1921). The Beginning of the Year in the Middle Ages. Proceedings of the British Academy. Vol. X. London: Oxford University Press. Archived from the original on 23 November 2021 – via HathiTrust.
- Poole, Robert (1998). Time's alteration : calendar reform in early modern England. UCL Press, Routledge Taylor & Francis. ISBN 9781857286229. Archived from the original on 23 January 2021.
- Steel, Duncan (2001). Marking Time: The Epic Quest to Invent the Perfect Calendar. New York: Wiley. ISBN 9780471404217. (also available as e-book)
- Young, Chester Raymond (1977). "The Observance of Old Christmas in Southern Appalachia". In J. W. Williamson (ed.). An Appalachian Symposium: Essays Written in Honor of Cratis D. Williams. Appalachian State University. pp. 147–158. doi:10.2307/j.ctt1xp3mkm.16. JSTOR j.ctt1xp3mkm.16.
- Chesterfield, Earl of (1751). Letters to his son (PDF). Archived (PDF) from the original on 1 November 2019 – via public-library.uk.
