= Old Style and New Style dates =

Changes in calendar conventions

Issue 9198 of The London Gazette, covering the calendar change in Great Britain. The issue spans the changeover; the date heading reads: "From Tuesday September 1, O.S. to Saturday September 16, N.S. 1752" (in fact 5 days).

Old Style (O.S.) and New Style (N.S.) indicate dating systems before and after a calendar change, respectively. Usually, they refer to the change from the Julian calendar to the Gregorian calendar as enacted in various European countries between 1582 and 1923. Consequently, the same day can have two dates, one for each calendar used to record it. Before as well as after the legal change, writers used the dual dating convention, to specify a given day by giving its date according to both styles of dating (to ensure that the day concerned was identified unambiguously).

In England, Wales, Ireland, and Britain's American colonies, there were two calendar changes, both in 1752. The first of these was to adjust the start of a new year from 25 March (Lady Day, the Feast of the Annunciation) to 1 January, a change which Scotland had already made over 150 years earlier. The second discarded the Julian calendar in favour of the Gregorian calendar, skipping 11 days in the calendar for September 1752 to do so.

For countries such as Russia where no start-of-year adjustment took place, (Note: By decrees (1735, 1736) of Peter the Great in December 1699 (with effect from 1 January 1700), Russia changed its start of year from September to January and adopted the AD era in place of Anno Mundi.) O.S. and N.S. simply indicate the Julian and Gregorian dating systems respectively.

== Differences between Julian and Gregorian dates ==
The need to correct the calendar arose from the realisation that the correct figure for the number of days in a year is not 365.25 (365 days 6 hours) as assumed by the Julian calendar but slightly less (c. 365.242 days). The Julian calendar therefore has too many leap years. The consequence was that the method for the calculation of the date of Easter, as decided in the 4th century, had drifted from astronomical reality. The Gregorian calendar reform made two changes: the first was to revise the leap year rule so as to have just 97 leap years in every 400 years (rather than 100); the second was to reverse the accumulated difference that had occurred between the years 325 and 1582. The latter was achieved by skipping 10 dates, thereby realigning the ecclesiastical date of the equinox to 21 March, which was deemed to have been the median date of the astronomical March equinox at the time of the First Council of Nicea in 325.

Countries that adopted the Gregorian calendar after 1699 needed to skip an additional day for each subsequent new century since then, when the Julian calendar had added a leap year but the Gregorian calendar had not. When the British Empire did so in 1752, the gap had grown to eleven days; (Note: Because 1600 was a leap year in both calendars, only one extra Julian leap day (in 1700) needed to be taken into account.) when Russia did so (as its civil calendar) in 1918, thirteen days needed to be skipped. (Note: Because 1600 was a leap year in both calendars, three extra Julian leap days (in 1700, 1800 and 1900) needed to be taken into account.)

It is for this reason that, although the Eastern Orthodox (Note: Some Eastern Orthodox churches have retained the traditional Julian calendar as the basis for their ecclesiastical calendar but others have adopted the Revised Julian calendar which coincides with the Gregorian calendar. See for example the introduction to December 25 (Eastern Orthodox liturgics) for a longer explanation.) churches and Western Christendom celebrate Christmas on 25 December according to their respective calendars, the day in which they do so differs by 13 days (until March 2100). Eastern Orthodox Christmas is 17 days after the typical date of the northern winter solstice, (Note: Although the astronomical solstice is a fixed event, its date depends on the calendar being used and the time since the last leap year adjustment. Consequently its date in the Gregorian calendar can be as early as 19 December or as late as 23 December: 21 December is merely the more common date.) whereas Western Christmas follows the solstice by four days. (See also Christmas#Date according to Julian calendar.)

== Britain and its colonies or possessions ==
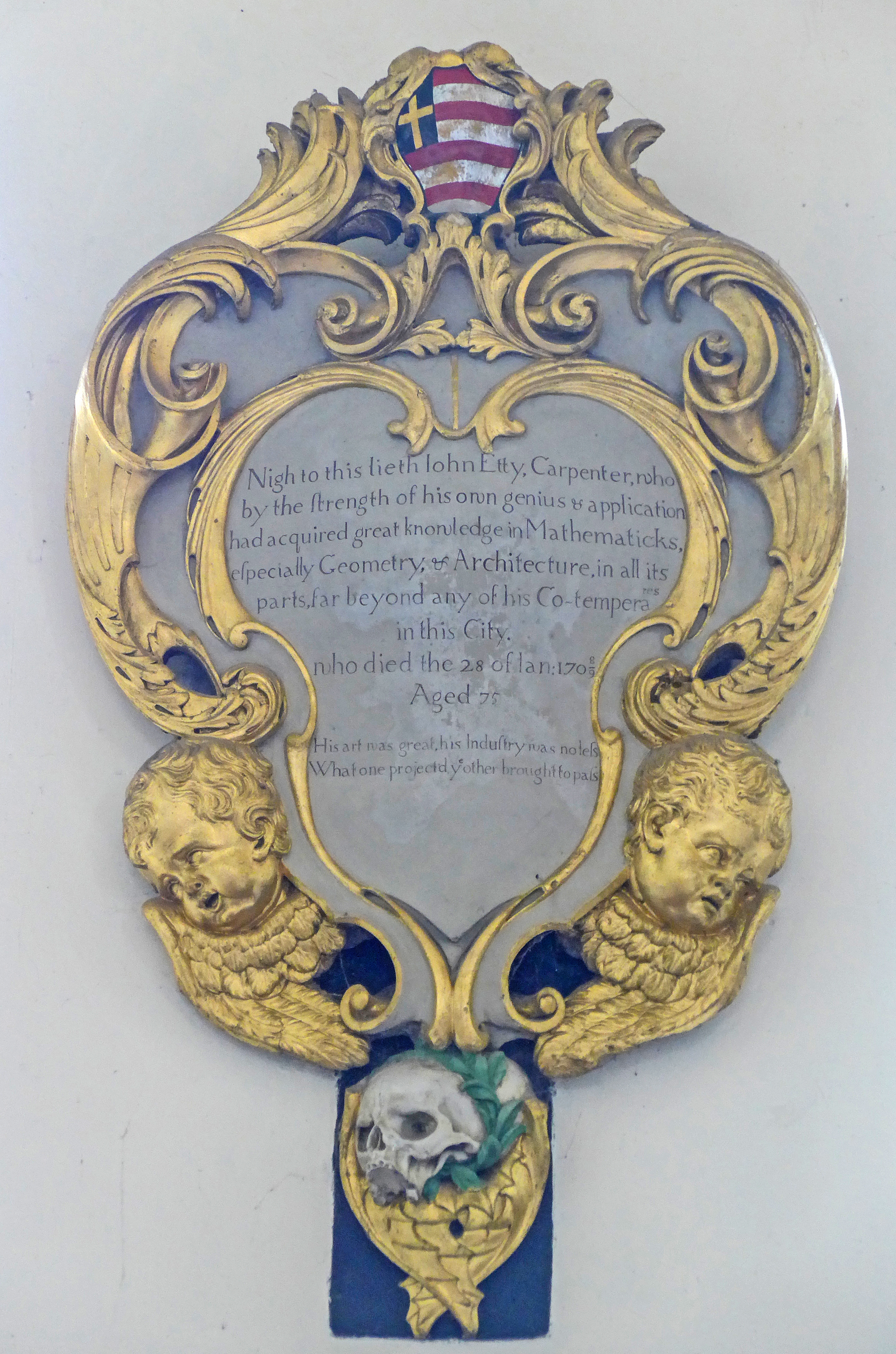
Memorial plaque to John Etty in All Saints' Church, North Street, York, recording his date of death as "28 of Jan: 170 8/9"

In the Kingdom of Great Britain and its possessions, the Calendar (New Style) Act 1750 (24 Geo. 2. c. 23) introduced two concurrent changes to the calendar. The first, which applied to England, Wales, Ireland and the British colonies, changed the start of the year from 25 March to 1 January, with effect from "the day after 31 December 1751". (Note: The act has to use this formulation since "1 January 1752" was still ambiguous.) (Scotland had already made this aspect of the changes, with effect from 1 January 1600.) The second (in effect (Note: The Calendar Act does not mention Pope Gregory)) adopted the Gregorian calendar in place of the Julian calendar. Thus "New Style" can refer to the start-of-year adjustment, to the adoption of the Gregorian calendar, or to the combination of the two. It was through their use in the 1750 act that the terms and notations "Old Style" and "New Style" came into common usage.

=== Start-of-year adjustment ===
When recording British history, it is usual to quote the date as originally recorded at the time of the event, but with the year number adjusted to start on 1 January. The latter adjustment may be needed because the start of the civil calendar year had not always been 1 January and was altered at different times in different countries. (Note: British official legal documents of the 16th and 17th centuries were usually dated by the regnal year of the monarch. As these commence on the day and date of the monarch's accession, they normally span two consecutive calendar years and have to be calculated accordingly, but the resultant dates should be unambiguous.) From 1155 to 1752, the civil or legal year in England began on 25 March (ie. Lady Day, following the Annunciation Style); so for example, the execution of Charles I was recorded at the time in Parliament as happening on 30 January 1648. In newer English-language texts, this date is usually shown as "30 January 1649", which is how chroniclers in Scotland would have recorded it. (The corresponding date in the Gregorian calendar was 9 February 1649, but this is not customarily used).

The O.S./N.S. designation is particularly relevant for dates which fall between the start of the "historical year" (1 January) and the legal start date, where different. This was 25 March in England, Wales, Ireland and the colonies until 1752, and until 1600 in Scotland. Thereafter, in both cases, it became 1 January.

In Britain, 1 January was celebrated as the New Year festival from as early as the 13th century, despite the recorded (civil) year not incrementing until 25 March, (Note: For example, see the Diary of Samuel Pepys for 31 December 1661: "I sat down to end my journell for this year, ...", which is immediately followed by an entry dated "1 January 1661/62". This is an example of the dual dating system which had become common at the time.) but the "year starting 25th March was called the Civil or Legal Year, although the phrase Old Style was more commonly used". To reduce misunderstandings about the date, it was normal even in semi-official documents such as parish registers to place a statutory new-year heading after 24 March (for example "1661") and another heading from the end of the following December, 1661/62, a form of dual dating to indicate that in the following twelve weeks or so, the year was 1661 Old Style but 1662 New Style. Some more modern sources, often more academic ones (e.g. the History of Parliament) also use the 1661/62 style for the period between 1 January and 24 March for years before the introduction of the New Style calendar in England.

==== Table ====
Examples of Old Style (O.S.) and New Style (N.S.) Dates for England and Colonies
Event	Old Style Date (Year begins 25 March)	Historical Julian Date (Year begins 1 January)	New Style Date (Gregorian calendar)	Day Drift	Explanation
Walter Raleigh's Virginia charter	24 March 1583	24 March 1584	3 April 1584	10 days	Signed on the final day of legal year 1583 O.S. A 10-day Gregorian drift applies.
Spanish Armada Battle of Gravelines	29 July 1588	29 July 1588	8 August 1588	10 days	July occurs after 25 March, so no year shift occurs. A 10-day Gregorian calendar drift applies relative to Spanish/Continental records.
Death of Elizabeth I	24 March 1602	24 March 1603	3 April 1603	10 days	Elizabeth died on the last day of the year of 1602 O.S.
English settlers arrive at Cape Henry, Virginia	26 April 1607	26 April 1607	6 May 1607	10 days behind	No year adjustment is needed because the month April occurs after 25 March. The Julian calendar was 10 days behind the Gregorian calendar.
Indian massacre of 1622	22 March 1621	22 March 1622	1 April 1622	10 days behind	The year number was adjusted because the event occurred before 25 March. Calendars were 10 days apart.
Birth of George Washington	11 February 1731	11 February 1732	22 February 1732	11 days	The year incremented because the date occurs before 25 March. The drift became 11 days because 1700 was a leap year in the Julian calendar, but not in the Gregorian.
The 1752 Calendar Transition	2 September 1752	2 September 1752	14 September 1752	11 days skipped	Wednesday, 2 September (O.S.) was immediately followed by Thursday, 14 September (N.S.) to discard the 11 accumulated days of drift (aligning with the Gregorian calendar).

== Russia ==
The Gregorian calendar was implemented in Russia on 14 February 1918 by dropping the Julian dates of 1–13 February 1918, (Note: The Julian calendar had by that time drifted by another three days since 1582 (in 1700, 1800 and 1900, see Century leap year) from astronomical reality, so thirteen days needed to be elided.) pursuant to a Sovnarkom decree signed 24 January 1918 (Julian) by Vladimir Lenin. The decree required that the Julian date was to be written in parentheses after the Gregorian date, until 1 July 1918.

It is common in English-language publications to use the familiar Old Style or New Style terms to discuss events and personalities in other countries, especially with reference to the Russian Empire and the very beginning of Soviet Russia. For example, in the article "The October (November) Revolution", the Encyclopædia Britannica uses the format of "25 October (7 November, New Style)" to describe the date of the start of the revolution.

== Other notations ==
=== Latin notation: st.v. and st.n. ===
The Latin equivalents, which are used in many languages, are, on the one hand, stili veteris (genitive) or stilo vetere (ablative), abbreviated st.v., and meaning "(of/in) old style"; and, on the other, stili novi or stilo novo, abbreviated st.n. and meaning "(of/in) new style". The Latin abbreviations may be capitalised differently by different users, e.g., St.n. or St.N. for stili novi. There are equivalents for these terms in other languages as well, such as the German a.St. ("alter Stil" for O.S.).

== Transposition of historical event dates and possible date conflicts ==
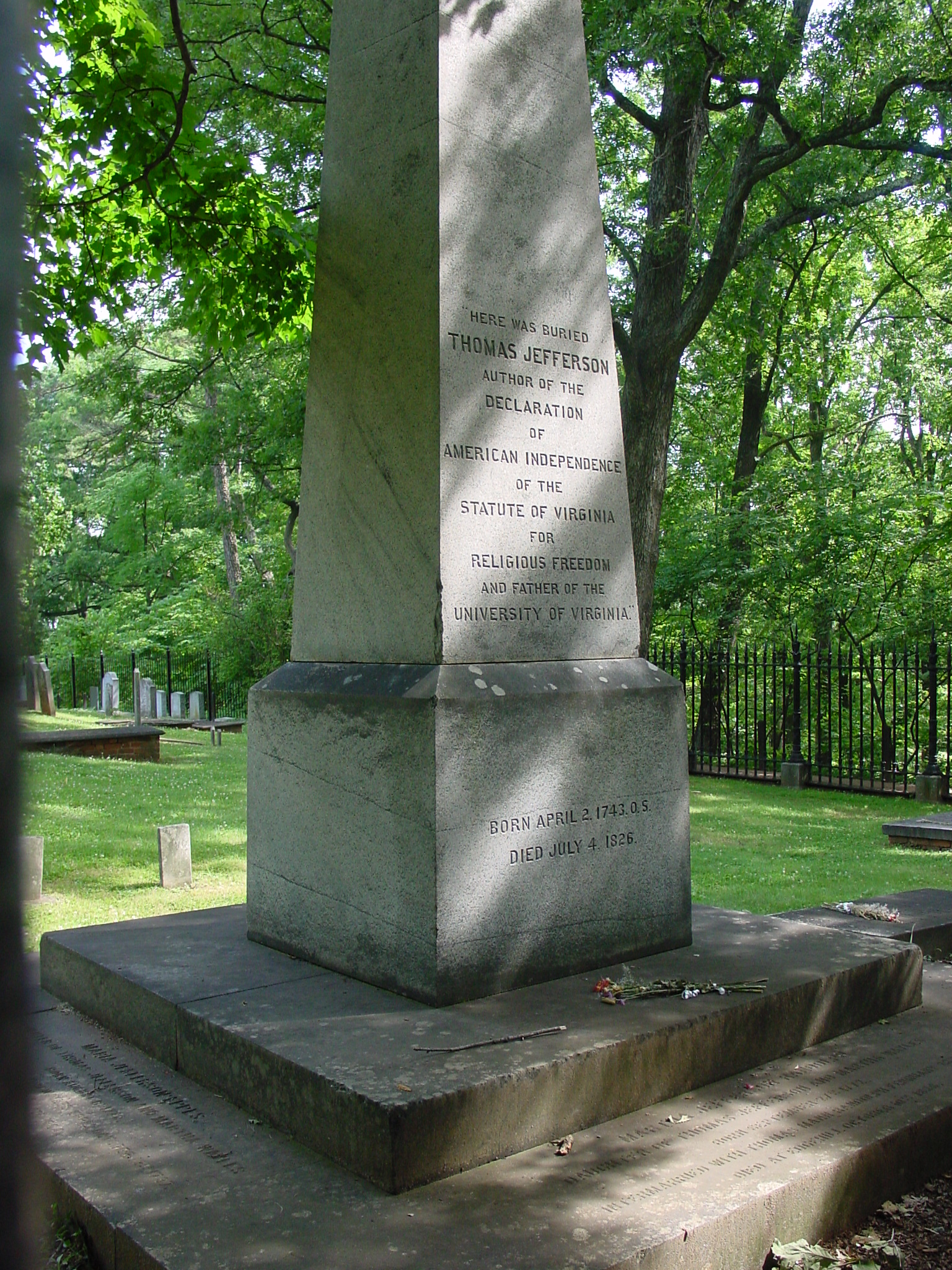
Thomas Jefferson's tombstone. Written below the epitaph is "Born April 2. 1743. O.S. Died July 4. 1826."

Usually, the mapping of New Style dates onto Old Style dates with a start-of-year adjustment works well with little confusion for events before the introduction of the Gregorian calendar. For example, the Battle of Agincourt is well known to have been fought on 25 October 1415, which is Saint Crispin's Day. However, for the period between the first introduction of the Gregorian calendar on 15 October 1582 and its introduction in Britain on 14 September 1752, there can be considerable confusion between events in Continental Western Europe and in British domains. Events in Continental Western Europe are usually reported in English-language histories by using the Gregorian calendar. For example, the Battle of Blenheim is always given as 13 August 1704. However, confusion occurs when an event involves both. For example, William III of England arrived at Brixham in England on 5 November (Julian calendar), after he had set sail from the Netherlands on 11 November (Gregorian calendar) 1688.

The Battle of the Boyne in Ireland took place a few months later on 1 July 1690 (Julian calendar). That maps to 11 July (Gregorian calendar), conveniently close to the Julian date of the subsequent (and more decisive) Battle of Aughrim on 12 July 1691 (Julian). The latter battle was commemorated annually throughout the 18th century on 12 July, following the usual historical convention of commemorating events of that period within Great Britain and Ireland by mapping the Julian date directly onto the modern Gregorian calendar date (as happens, for example, with Guy Fawkes Night on 5 November). The Battle of the Boyne was commemorated with smaller parades on 1 July. However, both events were combined in the late 18th century, and continue to be celebrated as "The Twelfth".

Because of the differences, British writers and their correspondents often employed two dates, a practice called dual dating, more or less automatically. Letters concerning diplomacy and international trade thus sometimes bore both Julian and Gregorian dates to prevent confusion. For example, Sir William Boswell wrote to Sir John Coke from The Hague a letter dated "12/22 Dec. 1635". In his biography of John Dee, The Queen's Conjurer, Benjamin Woolley surmises that because Dee fought unsuccessfully for England to embrace the 1583/84 date set for the change, "England remained outside the Gregorian system for a further 170 years, communications during that period customarily carrying two dates". In contrast, Thomas Jefferson, who lived while the British Isles and colonies converted to the Gregorian calendar, instructed that his tombstone bear his date of birth by using the Julian calendar (notated O.S. for Old Style) and his date of death by using the Gregorian calendar. At Jefferson's birth, the difference was eleven days between the Julian and Gregorian calendars and so his birthday of 2 April in the Julian calendar is 13 April in the Gregorian calendar. Similarly, George Washington is now officially reported as having been born on 22 February 1732, rather than on 11 February 1731/32 (Julian calendar). The philosopher Jeremy Bentham, born on 4 February 1747/8 (Julian calendar), in later life celebrated his birthday on 15 February.

There is some evidence that the calendar change was not easily accepted. Many British people continued to celebrate their holidays "Old Style" well into the 19th century, (Note: See also Little Christmas.) a practice that the author Karen Bellenir considered to reveal a deep emotional resistance to calendar reform.

== See also ==
- Dual dating – Date given in two different calendars
- Difference between Gregorian and Julian calendar dates (ready-reckoner)
- Old New Year – Informal traditional holiday based on the Julian calendar
- Little Christmas – Alternative title for 6 January ("Old Christmas")
- Swedish Style, a dating system used in Sweden in 1700–1712

== Sources ==
- Bond, John James (1875). Handy Book of Rules and Tables for Verifying Dates With the Christian Era Giving an Account of the Chief Eras and Systems Used by Various Nations...'. London: George Bell & Sons. Archived from the original on 21 November 2020.
- Cheney, C. R.; Jones, Michael, eds. (2000). A Handbook of Dates for Students of British History (PDF). Royal Historical Society Guides and Handbooks. Vol. 4 (Revised ed.). Cambridge: Cambridge University Press. pp. 17–20. ISBN 978-0-521-77095-8.
- Gerard, John (1908). "General Chronology § Beginning of the year" . In Herbermann, Charles (ed.). Catholic Encyclopedia. Vol. 3. New York: Robert Appleton Company.
- Russia: the October (November) Revolution (Online ed.). Encyclopædia Britannica. 2007.
- Steele, Duncan (2000). Marking Time: the epic quest to invent the perfect calendar. New York: John Wiley & Sons. ISBN 978-0471404217.
- Poole, Robert (1995). "'Give us our eleven days!': calendar reform in eighteenth-century England". Past & Present (149). Oxford Academic: 95–139. doi:10.1093/past/149.1.95. Archived from the original on 5 December 2014.
