= Adoption of the Gregorian calendar =

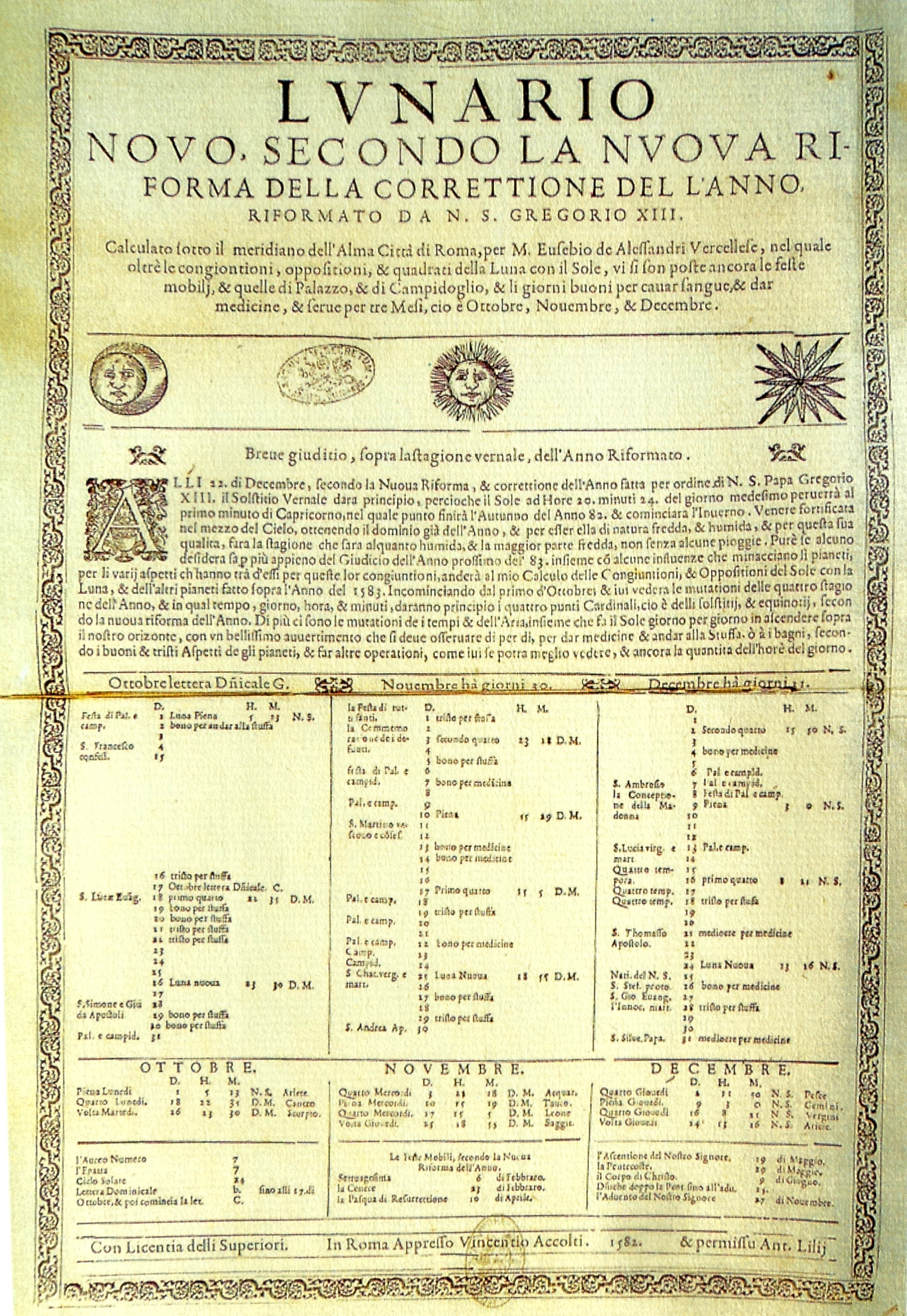
Lunario Novo, Secondo la Nuova Riforma della Correttione del l'Anno Riformato da N.S. Gregorio XIII, printed in Rome by Vincenzo Accolti in 1582, one of the first printed editions of the new calendar.

The adoption of the Gregorian Calendar has taken place in the history of most cultures and societies around the world, marking a change from one of various traditional (or "old style") dating systems to the contemporary (or "new style") system – the Gregorian Calendar – which is widely used around the world today. Some polities adopted the new calendar in 1582, others not before the early twentieth century, and others at various dates between. A few have yet to do so, but except for these, the Gregorian Calendar is now the universal civil calendar, yet old style calendars remain in use in religious or traditional contexts. (Note: The international standard for the representation of dates and times, ISO 8601, uses the Gregorian calendar. Section 3.2.1.) During – and for some time after – the transition between systems, it has been common to use the terms "Old Style" and "New Style" in dating to indicate which calendar was used to reckon them.

Pope Gregory XIII instituted the Gregorian Calendar in 1582 by the Papal bull Inter gravissimas to correct an error in the Julian Calendar that was causing an erroneous calculation of the date of Easter. The Julian Calendar had been based on a year of 365.25 days, but this was slightly too long; in reality it is circa 365.2422 days, (Note: The average year in the Gregorian Calendar is 365.2425 days.) and so over centuries the Calendar had drifted increasingly out of alignment with the orbit of Earth. According to Gregory's scientific advisors, the Calendar had acquired 10 excess leap days since the First Council of Nicaea, which established the rule for dating Easter in AD 325. Consequently, he ruled, the numbering, i. e. dating, of days must jump by 10 to restore the status quo ante; thus, for example, when the Catholic polities of Europe adopted the Gregorian Calendar, the day after Thursday, 4 October 1582 was dated as Friday, 15 October 1582. Polities that did not change calendars until the 18th century had by then observed 1700 as an additional leap year, necessitating the omission of 11 dates from the reckoning. Some polities did not change until the 19th or 20th centuries, necessitating the omission of 12 or 13 dates.

Although Gregory's reform was instituted in the most solemn of forms available to the Church, the bull had no authority beyond ecclesial institutions and the Papal States. The changes he proposed were to the civil calendar, which was not directly subject to Papal authority. For these changes to be legally effectuated, the civil authority of each polity was needed. The bull became canon law of the Catholic Church in 1582, but Protestant churches, Eastern Orthodox Churches, and a few others did not effectuate it, and therefore the dates on which different Christian denominations celebrated Easter and other holidays diverged.

== Adoption in Catholic polities ==
Catholic polities such as the Catholic states of the Holy Roman Empire, the Italian principalities, Poland–Lithuania, and Spain–Portugal and its European and overseas possessions were first to adopt the Gregorian Calendar: Thursday, 4 October 1582 was succeeded by Friday, 15 October 1582, with 10 dates between omitted.

Philip II of Spain decreed the change from the Julian to Gregorian Calendar, which affected much of Catholic Europe, as Philip was at the time ruler of Spain–Portugal and much of modern Italy. In these territories, Poland–Lithuania (ruled by Anna Jagiellon), and the Papal States, the Gregorian Calendar was implemented on the date that the bull prescribed, with Julian Thursday, 4 October 1582 being succeeded by Gregorian Friday, 15 October 1582; the Spanish and Portuguese colonies followed somewhat later de facto because of delay in communication of the change.

Other Catholic polities soon followed. France adopted the new calendar with Sunday, 9 December 1582 being succeeded by Monday, 20 December 1582. The Dutch provinces of Brabant and Zeeland, and the States General adopted it on 25 December of that year; the provinces forming the Southern Netherlands (modern Belgium) except the Duchy of Brabant adopted it on 1 January 1583; the province of Holland adopted it on 12 January 1583. The seven Catholic Swiss cantons adopted the new calendar in January 1584.

== Adoption in Protestant polities ==
Many Protestant polities initially objected to adoption of a Catholic innovation; some Protestants feared the new calendar was part of a plot to return them to the Catholic fold. In England, for example, Queen Elizabeth I and her privy council had looked favourably to a Gregorian-like royal commission recommendation to omit 10 dates from the Julian Calendar, but the virulent opposition of the Anglican bishops, who argued that the Pope was undoubtedly the fourth great beast of Daniel, caused the Queen to permit the matter to quietly drop. In the Czech Lands, Protestants resisted the Gregorian Calendar that the Habsburg monarchy imposed. In parts of Ireland, Catholic rebels, until their defeat in the Nine Years' War, retained the "new" Easter of the Gregorian Calendar in defiance of the authorities who were loyal to England; later, Catholics practising in secret petitioned the Propaganda Fide of the Holy See for dispensation from observance of the new calendar, because it signalled disloyalty to England.

=== Denmark-Norway and Brandenburg-Pomerania ===
In 1700, through Ole Rømer's influence, Denmark–Norway adopted the solar portion of the Gregorian calendar simultaneously with the Brandenburg-Pomerania and other Protestant estates of the Holy Roman Empire. Sunday, 18 February 1700, was followed by Monday, 1 March 1700. None of these states adopted the lunar portion, instead calculating the date of Easter astronomically using the instant of the vernal equinox and the full moon according to Kepler's Rudolphine Tables of 1627; this combination was referred to by the Protestant estates as "the improved calendar" (Der Verbesserte Kalender) and considered to be distinct from the Gregorian. They finally adopted the Gregorian calculation of Easter in 1774.

=== Rest of the Dutch Republic ===
The remaining provinces of the Dutch Republic adopted the Gregorian calendar on 12 July 1700 (Gelderland), 12 December 1700 (Overijssel and Utrecht), 12 January 1701 (Friesland and Groningen) and 12 May 1701 (Drenthe).

=== Great Britain and its colonies ===
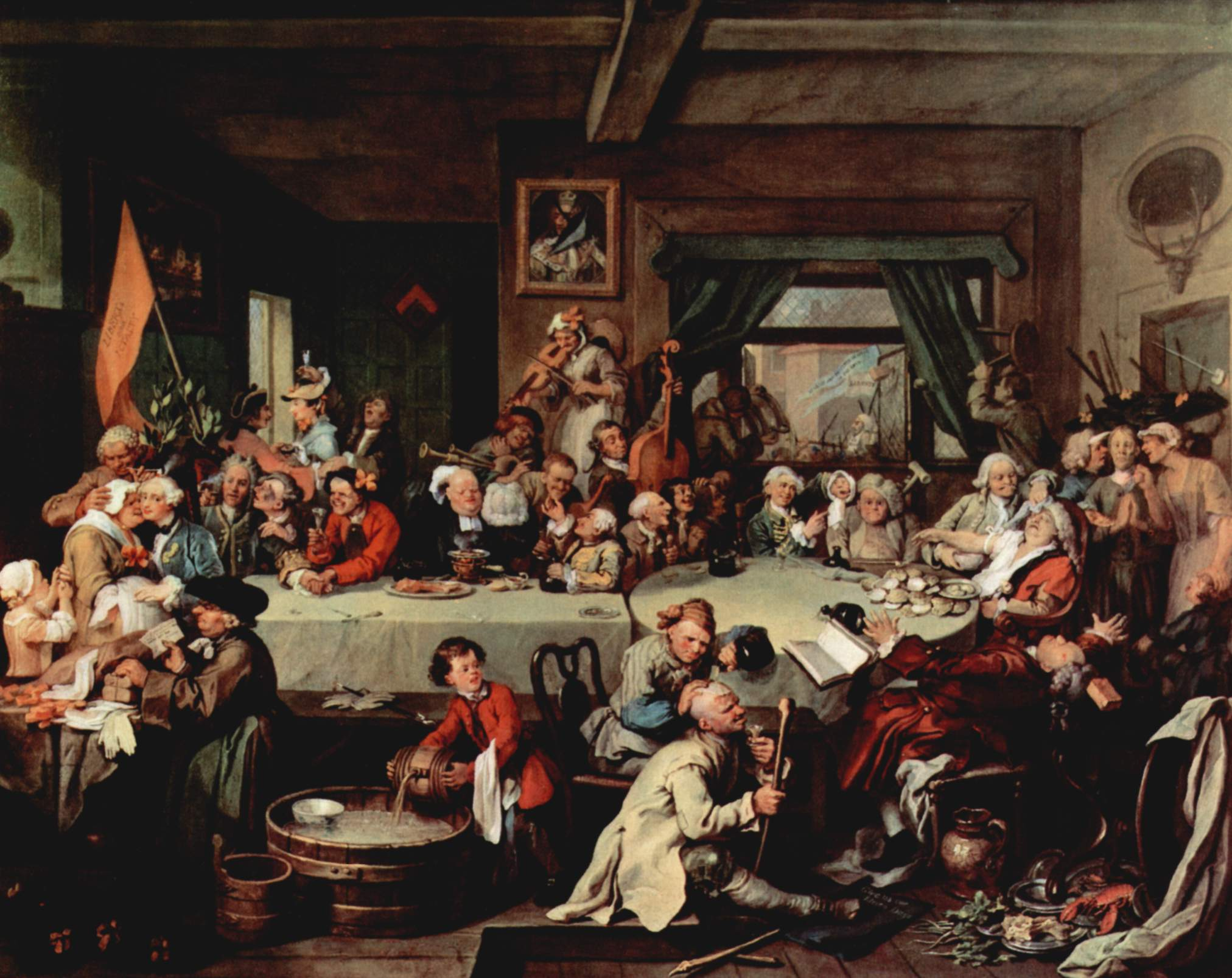
William Hogarth painting: Humours of an Election (c. 1755), which is the main source for the "Give us our Eleven Days" mythical riots.

Through enactment of the Calendar (New Style) Act 1750, Great Britain and its possessions (including parts of what is now the United States) adopted the Gregorian calendar in 1752, by which time it was necessary to correct by 11 days. Wednesday, 2 September 1752, was followed by Thursday, 14 September 1752. In Great Britain, the term "New Style" was used for the calendar and the Act omits any acknowledgement of Pope Gregory: the Annexe to the Act established a computation for the date of Easter that achieved the same result as Gregory's rules, without actually referring to him.

With the same Act, the Empire (except Scotland, which had already done so from 1600) changed the start of the civil year from 25 March to 1 January. Consequently, the custom of dual dating (giving a date in both old and new styles) can refer to the Julian/Gregorian calendar change, or to the start of year change, or to both.

=== Prussia ===
The Lutheran Duchy of Prussia, until 1657 still a fiefdom of Catholic Poland, was the first Protestant state to adopt the Gregorian calendar. Under the influence of its liege lord, the King of Poland, it agreed in 1611 to do so. So 22 August was followed by 2 September 1612. However, this calendar change did not apply to other territories of the Hohenzollern, such as Berlin-based Brandenburg, a fief of the Holy Roman Empire.

=== Sweden ===
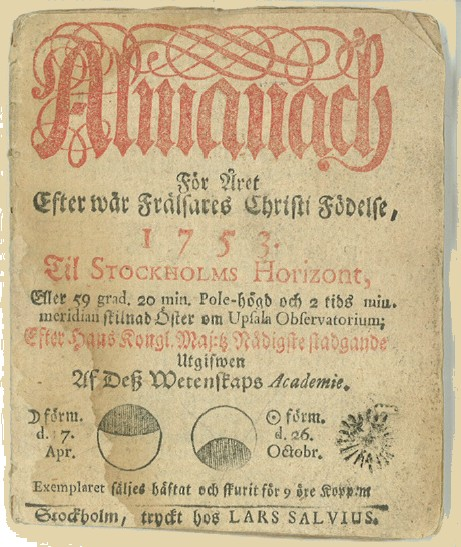
Swedish Almanach of 1753

Sweden's transition to the Gregorian calendar was difficult and protracted. Sweden started to make the change from the Julian calendar and towards the Gregorian calendar in 1700, but it was decided to make the (then 11-day) adjustment gradually by excluding the leap days (29 February) from each of 11 successive leap years, 1700 to 1740. Meanwhile, the Swedish calendar would be out of step with both the Julian calendar and the Gregorian calendar for 40 years; also, the difference would not be constant but would change every four years. This system had the potential for confusion when working out the dates of Swedish events in this 40-year period. To add to the confusion, the system was poorly administered, and the leap days that should have been excluded in 1704 and 1708 were not excluded. The Swedish calendar (according to the transition plan) should have been 8 days behind the Gregorian but was 10 days behind. King Charles XII recognised that the gradual change to the new system was not working, and he abandoned it.

Rather than proceeding directly to the Gregorian calendar, it was decided to revert to the Julian calendar. This was achieved by introducing the unique date 30 February in 1712, adjusting the discrepancy in the calendars from 10 back to 11 days. Sweden finally adopted the solar portion of the Gregorian calendar in 1753, when Wednesday, 17 February, was followed by Thursday, 1 March. What became later Finland was an integral part of the Swedish kingdom at that time, hence it did the same. The Russian Empire's 1809 conquest of Finland did not revert this, since autonomy was granted, but government documents in Finland were dated in both the Julian and Gregorian styles. This practice ended when independence was gained in 1917.

=== Rest of Switzerland ===
As noted above, the Catholic cantons of Switzerland adopted the new calendar in 1582. Geneva and several Protestant cantons adopted it in January 1701 or at other dates throughout the 18th century. The two Swiss communes of Schiers and Grüsch were the last areas of Western and Central Europe to switch to the Gregorian calendar, in 1812.

== Adoption in Eastern Europe ==
Many of the countries of eastern Europe were Eastern Orthodox or Islamic and adopted the Gregorian calendar much later than western Christian countries. Catholic countries such as the Polish–Lithuanian Commonwealth adopted the "new style" (N.S.) Gregorian calendar in 1582 (switched back in 1795 after the Third Partition of Poland), but the switch to the Gregorian calendar for secular use occurred in Eastern Orthodox countries as late as the 20th century. Some religious groups in some of these countries, known as Old Calendarists, still use the "old style" (O.S.) Julian calendar for ecclesiastical purposes.

The Kingdom of Bulgaria changed from the Julian to the Gregorian calendar in 1916 during the First World War. 31 March was followed by 14 April 1916.

=== Turkey ===
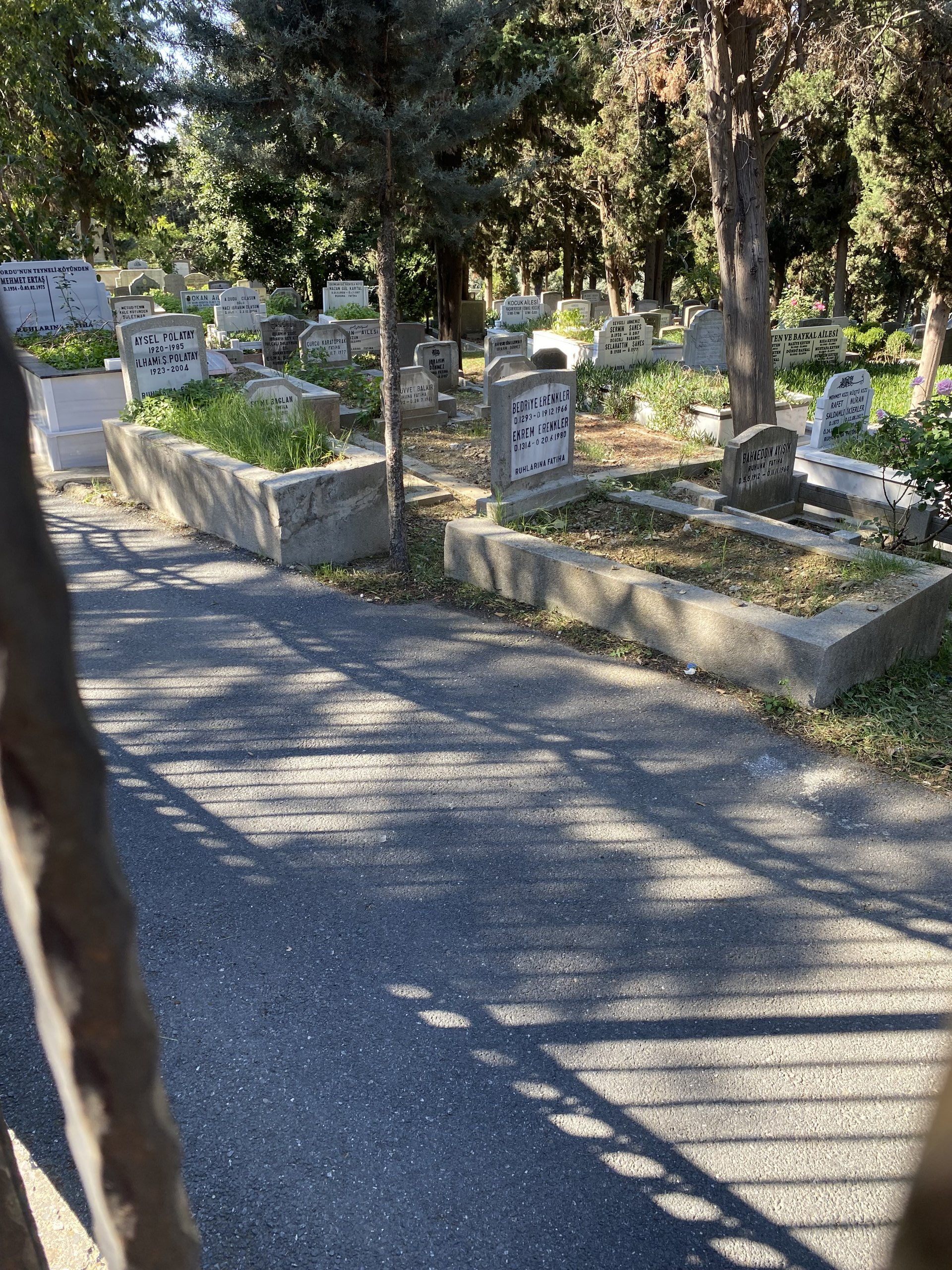
Gravestones at Feriköy Cemetery in Istanbul with Hijri birth years and Gregorian death dates

The Ottoman Empire's Rumi calendar, used for fiscal purposes, was realigned from a Julian to a Gregorian basis starting on 16 February / 1 March 1917. The beginning of the year was reset to 1 January starting in 1918. (Note: See discussion and references at Rumi calendar.) The numbering of the years, though, remained uniquely Turkish until Turkey adopted the Gregorian calendar on 1 January 1926. The transition left a visible trace in historical records: gravestones from the early Republican era in cemeteries such as Feriköy Cemetery commonly show birth years in the Hijri calendar and death dates in the Gregorian calendar. Since exact birth dates were often unrecorded and a Hijri year usually spans two Gregorian years, the precise Gregorian birth year cannot be determined from these inscriptions.

=== Russia ===
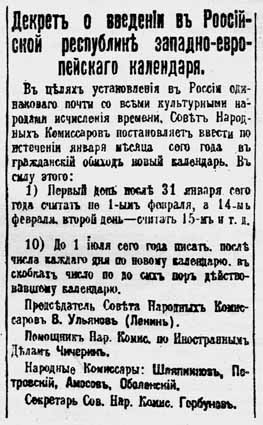
Partial Russian text of the decree adopting the Gregorian calendar in Russia as published in Pravda on 25 January 1918 (Julian) or 7 February 1918 (Gregorian). It instructed citizens to count the day after 31 January as 14 February.

In Russia, the Gregorian calendar was accepted after the October Revolution. On 24 January 1918, the Council of People's Commissars issued a decree that Wednesday, 31 January 1918, was to be followed by Thursday, 14 February 1918, thus dropping 13 days from the calendar. (Note: The Julian calendar had by that time drifted by another three days since 1582 (in 1700, 1800 and 1900, see Century leap year) from astronomical reality, so thirteen days needed to be elided.) The decree required that the Julian date was to be written in parentheses after the Gregorian date, until 1 July 1918. With the change, the October Revolution itself, once converted, took place on 7 November. Articles about the October Revolution that mention this date difference tend to do a full conversion to the dates from Julian to the Gregorian calendar. For example, in the article "The October (November) Revolution" the Encyclopædia Britannica uses the format of "25 October (7 November, New Style)" to describe the date of the start of the revolution.

=== Ukraine ===
In the territory of modern Ukraine, the Gregorian calendar was officially adopted for secular use immediately after its adoption by Pope Gregory XIII in 1582, as most of Ukraine then was part of the predominantly Catholic Polish-Lithuanian Commonwealth. The Roman Catholic Church in Ukraine switched to the new calendar at the same time. However, the Orthodox churches in the Commonwealth refused to accept a calendar instigated by a Roman Catholic Pope, so the Orthodox Church of Ukraine continued to use the old Julian calendar (until 2023, when it adopted the Revised Julian calendar).

In 2018, the Ukrainian Lutheran Church switched to the Revised Julian calendar. After the second Russian invasion (in 2022), most other Christian denominations that were still using the old Julian calendar announced that they would transition to the Gregorian or the Revised Julian calendar. The All-Ukrainian Union of Churches of Evangelical Christian Baptists and the Church of Christians of the Evangelical Faith of Ukraine (Pentecostals) switched to the Gregorian calendar the same year. On 1 September 2023, the Ukrainian Greek Catholic Church switched to the Gregorian calendar, while the Orthodox Church of Ukraine opted for the Revised Julian calendar. At the same time, the Ukrainian Orthodox Church (Moscow Patriarchate) declared that it would continue to use the old Julian calendar.

=== Others ===
Other countries of Eastern Europe, most notably Eastern Orthodox countries, retained the Julian calendar for secular purposes until the 1910s or early 1920s. By the 20th century, the date on the Julian calendar was 13 days behind that on the Gregorian calendar. Romania adopted the Gregorian calendar in 1919, with 31 March 1919 being followed by 14 April 1919.

The last country of Eastern Orthodox Europe to adopt the Gregorian calendar for secular purposes was Greece, at the time under military administration following the 11 September 1922 Revolution. The date of change was 1 March 1923. As a consequence, Wednesday 15 February 1923 in the Greek calendar was followed by Thursday 1 March 1923. The decree expressly limited the reform to lay (i.e. non-religious) matters, so the reform did not affect the dates of religious holidays. (See below.)

=== Non-adoption by Eastern Orthodox and Oriental Orthodox churches ===
While the civil administrations of Eastern European countries adopted the Gregorian calendar in the 1910s or early 1920s, none of the national Eastern Orthodox Churches have recognised the Gregorian calendar for church or religious purposes. Instead, the Revised Julian calendar was proposed in May 1923 at the Council of Constantinople. It uses a different leap year rule, leading to the mean year being slightly shorter than that of the Gregorian calendar, while being constructed in such a way as to maximise the time before its dates start to diverge from the Gregorian. There will be no difference between the two calendars until 2800.

The Greek Orthodox Church of Jerusalem, Russian Orthodox Church, Serbian Orthodox Church, Georgian Orthodox and Apostolic Church, Polish Orthodox Church, Macedonian Orthodox Church and the Greek Old Calendarists did not accept the Revised Julian calendar, and continue to celebrate Christmas on 25 December in the Julian calendar, which is 7 January in the Gregorian calendar until 2100.

All of the other Eastern churches, the Oriental Orthodox churches (Coptic Orthodox Church of Alexandria, Ethiopian Orthodox Tewahedo Church, Eritrean Orthodox Tewahdo Church, and Syriac Orthodox Church) continue to use their own calendars, which usually result in fixed dates being celebrated in accordance with the Julian calendar. This is most interesting in the case of the Syriac Orthodox Church, as one of its Patriarchs, Ignatius Nemet Allah I, was one of the nine scholars who devised the Gregorian calendar. The Indian Orthodox Church uses the Gregorian calendar along with their autonomous Syriac Orthodox counterparts in India, the Malankara Jacobite Syriac Orthodox Church.

The Armenian Apostolic Church adopted the Gregorian calendar in 1923, except in the Armenian Patriarchate of Jerusalem, where the old Julian calendar is still in use.

== Adoption in the Americas ==
The European colonies of the Americas adopted the change when their mother countries did. In North America, New France and New Spain adopted the new calendar in 1582. The Portuguese and Spanish colonies in South America also changed in 1582. The British colonies of Canada and the Thirteen Colonies followed suit in 1752, as legislated by the British calendar act. Practice in the Caribbean followed that of their British, Dutch, French and Spanish colonists.

=== Alaska ===
Alaska remained on the Julian calendar along with the rest of Russia until 1867, when the territory was sold to the United States. At noon on Saturday, 7 October 1867 (Julian), the date changed to Friday, 18 October 1867 (Gregorian). Although the Julian calendar was 12 days behind the Gregorian calendar, only 11 days were skipped because Alaska also moved from the Eurasian side of the International Date Line to the American side.

== Polities with lunisolar calendars ==
=== Adoption in East Asia ===
Japan, Korea, and China started using the Gregorian calendar on 1 January 1873, 1 January 1896, and 1 January 1912, respectively. They previously used lunisolar calendars. The Old Style and New Style dates in these countries usually mean the older lunisolar dates and the newer Gregorian calendar dates respectively. In these countries, the old style calendars were similar but not all the same. The Arabic numerals may be used for both calendar dates in modern Japanese and Korean languages, but not for Chinese old-style dates.

==== Japan ====
Japan decided to officially replace its traditional lunisolar calendar with the Gregorian calendar in 1872, so the day following 31 December 1872 as "the second day of the twelfth month of Meiji 5" (明治5年12月2日, Meiji gonen jūnigatsu futsuka) became 1 January 1873, locally known as "the first day of the first month of Meiji 6" (明治6年1月1日, Meiji rokunen ichigatsu tsuitachi). (The Japanese rendering of the Western months is simply ichi-gatsu or "One-month" for January, ni-gatsu or "Two-month" for February, etc.) This brought Japan's calendar in alignment with that of the major Western powers (excluding Russia).

To this day, however, it is common to use reign names (nengō), especially for official documents; for instance, Meiji 1 for 1868, Taishō 1 for 1912, Shōwa 1 for 1926, Heisei 1 for 1989, Reiwa 1 for 2019, and so on. The months and days are those of the Gregorian calendar, but the year is either the "Western calendar" (西暦, seireki) year number per the Common Era or Anno Domini system, or a year of the nengō of the emperor on the throne. Since 1873, an era and the first year of that era has begun on the day of the year that the emperor ascended the throne. The second year of that era began on the next 1 January even if the first year contained only a few days. All subsequent years of that era began on 1 January until that emperor died or abdicated. For example, the first year of the Showa Era, that of Emperor Hirohito, contained only the last six days of 1926, while Showa 64, his last year, contained only the first seven days of 1989. The current Gregorian year 2026 corresponds to Reiwa 8.

==== Korea ====
Replacing its years numbered from 1392, the founding of the Joseon dynasty, Korea started using the Gregorian calendar on 1 January 1896, which was the 17th day of the 11th lunar month not only in Korea but also in China, which still used the lunisolar calendar. Yet Korean era names were used for its years through 1910; and between 1910 and 1945, when Korea was under Japanese rule, Japanese era names were used to count the years of the Gregorian calendar used in Korea.

In South Korea, from 1945 until 1961, Gregorian calendar years were also counted from the foundation of Gojoseon in 2333 BC (regarded as year one), the date of the legendary founding of Korea by Dangun, hence these Dangi (단기) years were 4278 to 4294. This numbering was informally used with the Korean lunar calendar before 1945 but is only occasionally used today. Since 1997, North Korea officially counts years based on the Juche era, the first year of which is 1912, the year of Kim Il Sung's birth, with Gregorian months and days. The current Gregorian year 2026 corresponds to Juche year 115.

==== China and Taiwan ====
At its founding on 1 January 1912, the Republic of China (ROC) government under Provisional President Sun Yat-sen abolished the lunisolar Chinese calendar and adopted the Gregorian calendar. The public, however, resisted the change and continued to observe traditional holidays. President Yuan Shikai switched to a dual-calendar policy, under which the Gregorian calendar was to be used for most purposes except traditional holidays, which were to be timed according to the Chinese calendar; this would also be followed by the short-lived Empire of China. (Note: The Government Gazette of the Empire of China would be dated in the Gregorian calendar in the first year of Hongxian, i.e. 1916.) With the 1928 unification of China under the Kuomintang, the Nationalist government decreed that, effective 1 January 1929, the Gregorian calendar would be used. The Republic of China calendar would retain the Chinese traditions of numbering the months with a modified era system, determined according to the traditional Chinese era names, but using the founding of the Republic of China government in 1912 as the start (epoch) rather than the regnal year of an emperor. The current Gregorian year 2026 corresponds to the ROC year 115. This system is still in use in Taiwan where the ROC government retains control since 1945.

Upon its foundation in 1949, the People's Republic of China continued to use the Gregorian calendar with numbered months and adopted Western numbered years, but timed traditional holidays according to the Chinese calendar and abolished the ROC Era System. Today mainland China (including Hong Kong and Macau), Taiwan, Malaysia, Indonesia and Singapore all observe traditional holidays based on the traditional calendar, such as Chinese New Year, while timing other holidays, especially national anniversaries, according to the Gregorian calendar. The adopted calendar in both mainland China and Taiwan is called the Public Calendar (simplified Chinese: 公历; traditional Chinese: 公曆; pinyin: Gōnglì), or "New Calendar" (simplified Chinese: 新历; traditional Chinese: 新曆; pinyin: Xīnlì).

The Chinese language may distinguish old and new style dates in different ways:

Grammar	Chinese calendar	Gregorian calendar
Writing a date in Chinese characters	Yes as the rule	Yes as an option
Writing a date in Arabic numerals	No (Note: Not supported by GB/T 15835-1995, GB/T 15835-2011 or GB/T 33661-2017) (Note: In Taiwan, the Central Weather Bureau used to issue lunisolar calendars in Chinese characters through 2008, but Arabic numerals from 2009 to 2014.)	Yes as an option
Omitting 日 (rì, day) from a date	Yes as an option	No, unless also omitting 月 (yuè, month), e.g. 一·二八 (yī èrbā, 28 January 1931) and 一二·九 (yīèr jiǔ, 9 December 1935) by pausing between a month and a day to disambiguate
Prefixing 初 (chū, initial) for the first 10 days of a month	Yes as an option	No (Note: Not supported by GB/T 15835-1995)
正月 (zhēngyuè) as the first month	Yes	No
元月 (yuányuè) or 一月 (yīyuè) as the first month	Yes as an option	Yes
冬月 (dōngyuè) as the eleventh month	Yes as an option	No, write November as 11月 or 十一月 (shíyīyuè, month 11)
臘月 (làyuè) as the twelfth month	Yes as an option	No, write December as 12月 or 十二月 (shíèryuè, month 12)

In speaking, people generally call the date in the Gregorian calendar month "No. dd" (simplified Chinese: dd号; traditional Chinese: dd號); for example, the Spring Festival of year 2017 is No. 28 of Month 1 (simplified Chinese: 1月28号; traditional Chinese: 1月28號). On the other hand, people never call dates on the Chinese calendar as "No. dd"., which avoids any possible ambiguity.

When referencing dates before the introduction of the Gregorian calendar in 1582, the official Chinese calendar may either inherit the issues with earlier calendars to be historically correct (Note: The 2000-year converter of Chinese and Western calendars by the Academia Sinica in Taiwan uses the Julian calendar from AD 1 to 4 October 1582 and allows users to customize the date of changing over from Julian to Gregorian calendar to suit specific needs. It uses Arabic numerals for both new and old style dates to ease programming, and considers AD 4 a common year to correct the leap year error.) or follow the proleptic Gregorian calendar if so specified. (Note: Simpler computer programming may just treat 1 January 1 as Monday as in the proleptic Gregorian calendar, though historically incorrect.)

=== Adoption in Southeast Asia ===
Vietnam adopted the Gregorian calendar in 1954, replacing the Vietnamese calendar, which was based on the Chinese calendar. Like China, Vietnam still uses the Vietnamese calendar to observe lunisolar holidays and celebrations.

The Gregorian calendar replaced the Burmese calendar in several mainland Southeast Asian kingdoms in the second half of the 19th century. This took place in Cambodia in 1863 and Laos in 1889. Since the British conquest of the Konbaung dynasty in 1886, the Gregorian calendar has been used alongside the Burmese calendar in Myanmar.

In 1889, Siam also switched to the Gregorian calendar as the official civil calendar, with the Rattanakosin Era (with 1782 as Year 1). The Thai lunar calendar remains in use for religious purposes.

== Islamic calendar ==
The lunar Higri calendar (commonly known in the West as the "Islamic calendar" because it is used by the majority of Muslims (Note: Iran (and Shia Islam) uses the solar Hijri calendar, which has twelve months of 30 or 31 days alternately. Being restarted every year at the March equinox, it does not have any formulaic leap days but years of 366 days occur about every four years, so it does so in effect. Consequently, it remains synchronised with the Gregorian calendar, albeit with different year numbering. Iran has not adopted the Gregorian calendar.)) has a year of twelve lunar months in a year of 354 or 355 days, being 11 days shorter than a solar year. Consequently, holy days in Sunni Islam migrate around the solar year on a 32-year cycle. Some countries in the Islamic world use the Gregorian calendar for civil purposes, while retaining the Islamic calendar for religious purposes. For example, Saudi Arabia adopted the Gregorian calendar for the purpose of paying public sector staff effective 1 October 2016; private sector employers had already adopted the Gregorian calendar for pay purposes.

== Present situation ==
Today, the vast majority of countries use the Gregorian calendar as their sole civil calendar. The four countries which have not adopted the Gregorian calendar are Ethiopia (Ethiopian calendar), Nepal (Vikram Samvat and Nepal Sambat), Iran and Afghanistan (Solar Hijri calendar).

Some countries use other calendars alongside the Gregorian calendar, including India (Indian national calendar), Bangladesh (Bengali calendar), Pakistan (Islamic calendar), Israel (Hebrew calendar) and Myanmar (Burmese calendar), and other countries use a modified version of the Gregorian calendar, including Thailand (Thai solar calendar), Japan (Japanese calendar), North Korea (North Korean calendar) and Taiwan (Minguo calendar).

While many religious organizations reckon their liturgical year by the Gregorian civil calendar, others have retained their own calendars. Alternative calendars are used in many regions of the world today to mark cycles of religious and astrological events.

== Possible date conflicts ==
The use of different calendars had the potential to cause confusion between contemporaries. For example, it is related that one of the contributory factors for Napoleon's victory at the Battle of Austerlitz was the confusion between the Russians, who were using the Julian calendar, and the Austrians, who were using the Gregorian calendar, over the date that their forces should combine. However, this tale is not supported in a contemporary account from a major-general of the Austrian Imperial and Royal Army, Karl Wilhelm von Stutterheim, who tells of a joint advance of the Russian and Austrian forces (in which he himself took part) five days before the battle, and it is explicitly rejected by some modern-day historians.

== Timeline ==
The date when each country adopted the Gregorian calendar, or an equivalent, is marked against a horizontal timeline. The vertical axis is used for expansion to show separate national names for ease in charting, but otherwise has no significance.

== Works cited ==
- Barsoum, Ighnāṭyūs Afrām (2003). Moosa, Matti (ed.). The scattered pearls : a history of Syriac literature and sciences. Translated by Matti Moosa. with a foreword by Cyril Aphrem Karim. Piscataway, NJ: Gorgias Press. ISBN 9781931956048. OCLC 54405272.
- Fruin, Robert (1934). Handboek der Chronologie, voornamelijk van Nederland [Handbook of Chronology, mainly from the Netherlands] (in Dutch). Alphen a/d Rijn: N. Samson. OCLC 63421371.
- Lee, Peter H., ed. (1996). Sourcebook of Korean Civilization. Vol. 2: From the seventeenth century to the modern period. New York: Columbia University Press. ISBN 9780231079129. OCLC 26353271.
- Lee, Peter H.; de Bary, W. T., eds. (2000). Sources of Korean Tradition. Vol. 2. (with Yongho Ch'oe & Kang, H. H. W.). New York: Columbia University Press. ISBN 9780231120302. OCLC 278499245.
- Sumner, Charles (1875). The cession of Russian America to the United States. The Works of Charles Sumner. Vol. 11. Boston: Lea and Shepard. p. 348.
