= Easter Act 1928 =

Act of the Parliament of the United Kingdom

Easter Act 1928 (Note: Section 2(1).)
- Act of Parliament
- Parliament of the United Kingdom
- Long title: An Act to regulate the date of Easter Day and days or other periods and occasions depending thereon.
- Citation: 18 & 19 Geo. 5. c. 35
- Introduced by: Sir John Simon
- Territorial extent: United Kingdom; Isle of Man; Channel Islands; (Note: Section 2(3).)

Dates
- Royal assent: 3 August 1928
- Commencement: Not yet in force (Never been in force) (Note: Section 2(2).)
Other legislation
Amends	Calendar (New Style) Act 1750
Amended by	Newfoundland (Consequential Provisions) Act 1950; South Africa Act 1962; Zimbabwe Act 1979
Relates to	Calendar (New Style) Act 1750

Status: Not yet in force

Text of statute as originally enacted

Revised text of statute as amended

Text of the Easter Act 1928 as in force today (including any amendments) within the United Kingdom, from legislation.gov.uk.

The Easter Act 1928 (18 & 19 Geo. 5. c. 35) is an act of the Parliament of the United Kingdom passed and enacted in 1928 concerning the date for Easter that has never come into force. The effect would be to establish Easter Sunday as the Sunday following the second Saturday in April, resulting in Easter Sunday being between 9 April and 15 April, instead of following the established date for Easter as a moveable feast.

The act requires the agreement (in the form of resolutions) of both the House of Commons and the House of Lords, before a commencement order is made by Order in Council. The Act also requires that before a draft order is submitted to Parliament, "regard shall be had to any opinion officially expressed by any Church or other Christian body".

Although the subject has been raised occasionally in Parliament in the decades since, the act has never been brought into force.

== See also ==
- Reform of the date of Easter
