= Dual dating =

Date given in two different calendars

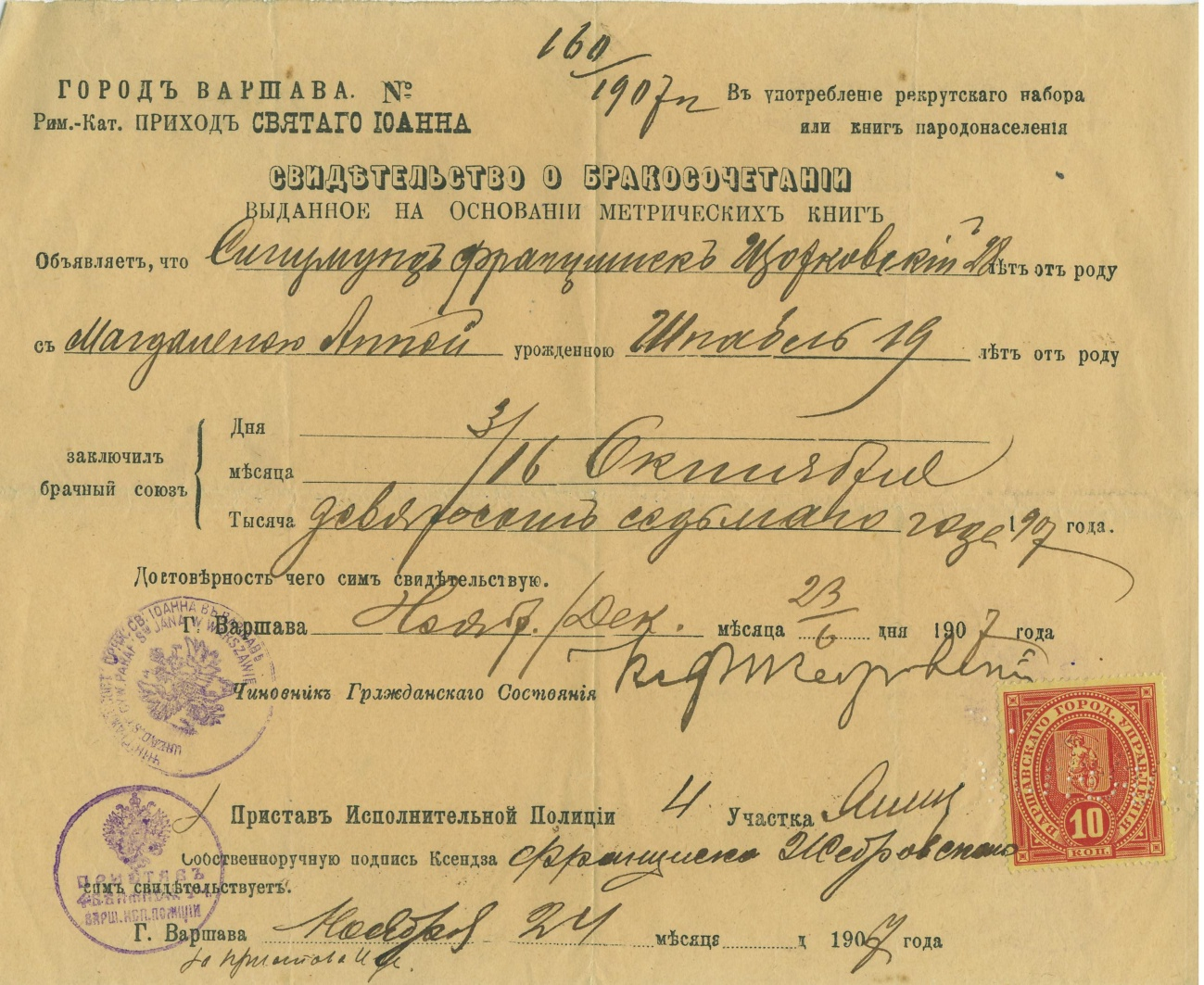
On this marriage certificate, made out in 1907 in Warsaw (then part of the Russian Empire), the month is given as "November/December", and the day as "23/6". The Julian date 23 November corresponded to the Gregorian 6 December.

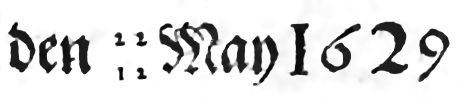
Excerpt of the cover page of a print of the Treaty of Lübeck (1629), with the Gregorian day (22) directly above the Julian (12), both before the name of the month, May. The treaty was concluded between Roman Catholic parties, who had adopted the Gregorian calendar, and Protestant parties, who had not.

Dual dating is the practice, in historical materials, of indicating a date with what appear to be duplicate or excessive digits: these may be separated by a hyphen or a slash, or placed one above the other. The need for dual dating arose from the transition from an older calendar to a newer one. Another method used is to give the date of an event according to one calendar, followed in parentheses by the date of the same event in the other calendar, appending an indicator to each to specify which reference calendar applies.

As an example, in the date "10/21 February 1750/51" – a style seen in the records of Great Britain and its possessions – the notation arises from the prospective or previous adoption of the Gregorian calendar and a concurrent calendar reform. (The dual day number is due to the eleven days difference (at the time) between the Julian calendar date and the Gregorian one; the dual year is due to a change of start of year, from 25 March to 1 January.)

After the Calendar (New Style) Act 1750 was passed, the notations "OS" (old style) and "NS" (new style) became dominant in historical writing about British and American events in the eighteenth century. This notation is also used when writing about Russian events in the early twentieth century.

== European countries and their colonies: Old Style and New Style dates ==
=== England, Wales, Scotland, Ireland and the American colonies ===
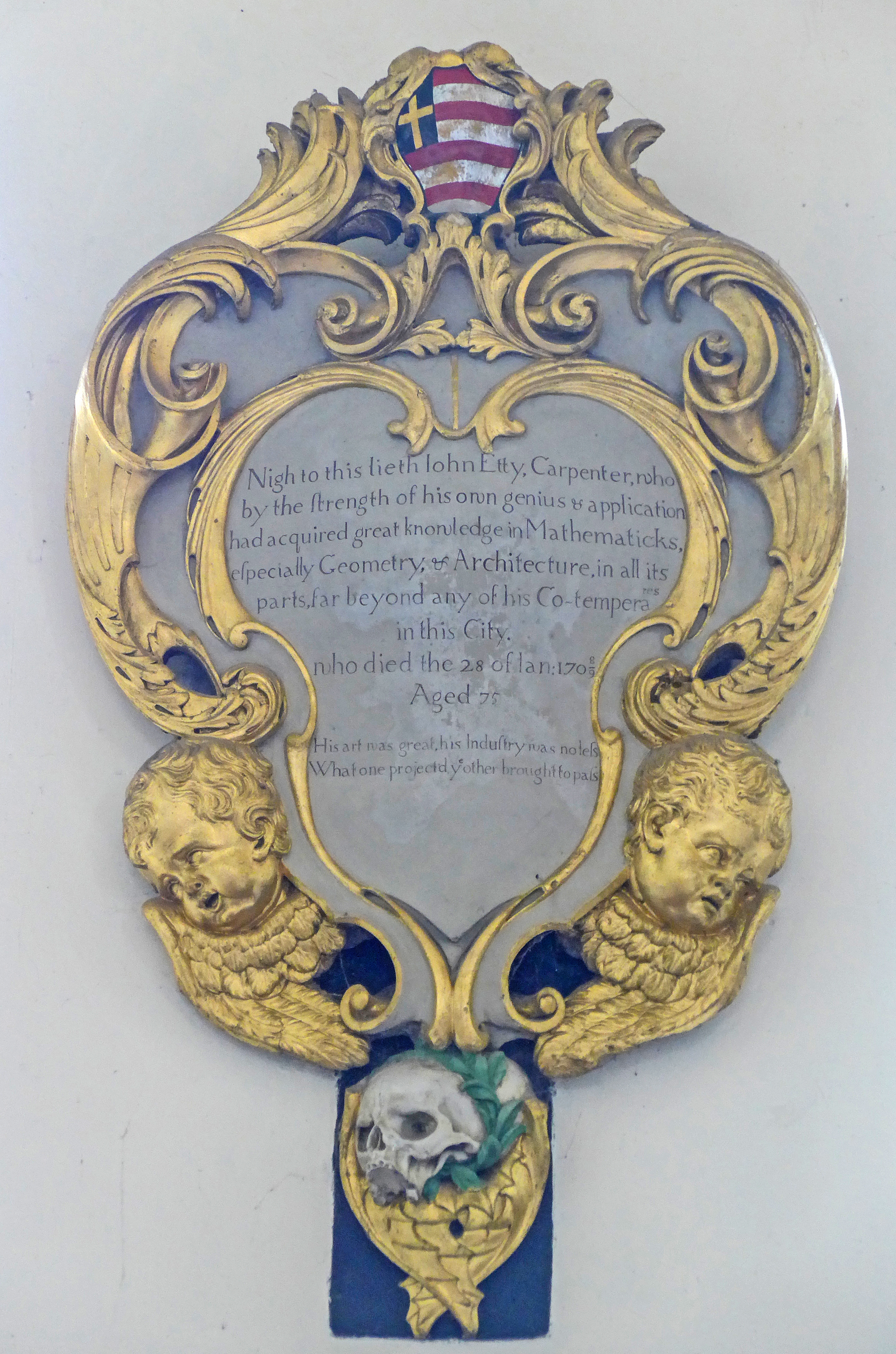
Memorial plaque to John Etty in All Saints' Church, North Street, York, recording his date of death as 28 January 170 8/9 (Julian calendar, different start of year)

Long before the British Empire adopted the Gregorian calendar, the date of the start of the year caused difficulties. (Note: Woolley, writing in his biography of John Dee (1527–1608/9), notes that immediately after 1582 English letter-writers "customarily" used "two dates" on their letters, one OS and one NS.) Until 1752, England, Wales, Ireland and the American colonies started the legal year on 25 March, whereas Scotland (since 1600), as well as common usage, started the year on 1 January. (Note: For example, see Pepys, Samuel. "Tuesday 31 December 1661". "I sat down to end my journell for this year, ..." (The Diary of Samuel Pepys)) This meant that a date such as 29 January, while being toward the end of a legal year, would also be near the beginning of the following "common" (and Scottish) year. It was to show this duality that the system of displaying two year numbers first came into use — examples may be seen on memorial tablets and in parish registers.

Dating based on the year beginning on 25 March became known as "Annunciation Style" dates, while dates of the year commencing on 1 January were described as "Circumcision Style" dates, because this was the date of the Feast of the Circumcision, commemorating the eighth day of Jesus Christ's life after his birth, counted from its observation on Christmas Day (25 December).

In 1752, England and its possessions changed the start of the year to 1 January, and also adopted the Gregorian calendar (on 2 September (Note: After 11 days were expunged, the following day became Thursday, 14 September.)). Thereafter, the terms "Old Style" (OS) and "New Style" (NS) were more commonly added to dates when it proved necessary or expedient to identify which calendar was being used for the given date. Often, both were given — for example: 20 January 1708 (OS) (1709 (NS)). There may be some confusion as to which calendar alteration OS or NS refers to: the change of the start of the year, or the transition of one style of calendar to another. Historically, OS referred only to the start of the year change, to 1 January from 25 March, and some historians still believe this is the best practice. However, OS and NS may refer to both alterations of the calendar: constructions like 31 August [O.S. 20 August] 1753 may be seen.

=== Rest of Europe ===
During the period between 1582, when the first countries adopted the Gregorian calendar, and 1923, when the last European country adopted it, (Note: see table at Adoption of the Gregorian calendar) it was often necessary to indicate the date of an event in both the Julian calendar and the Gregorian calendar.

Although the OS/NS notation was originally used only to clarify the date of events in the British Empire, the usage was reprised in more recent English-language histories of Russia, which retained the Julian calendar until 1918. For example, the beginning of the October Revolution may be recorded as 25 October [N.S. 7 November] 1917 (or 7 November [O.S. 25 October] 1917).

== East Asia ==
Japan, Korea, and China started using the Gregorian calendar on 1 January 1873, 1896, and 1912, respectively. They had used lunisolar calendars previously. None of them used the Julian calendar; the Old Style and New Style dates in these countries usually mean the older lunisolar dates and the newer Gregorian calendar dates respectively. In these countries, the old style calendars were similar, but not all the same. The Arabic numerals may be used for both calendar dates in modern Japanese and Korean languages, but not in Chinese language.

=== Japan ===
Japan started using the Gregorian calendar on 1 January 1873, locally known as "the first day of the first month of Meiji 6" (明治6年1月1日, Meiji rokunen ichigatsu tsuitachi). The preceding day, 31 December 1872, was "the second day of the twelfth month of Meiji 5" (明治5年12月2日, Meiji gonen jūnigatsu futsuka).

Japan currently employs two calendar systems: Gregorian and the Japanese era name calendar. Specifically, the months and days now correspond to those of the Gregorian calendar, but the year is expressed as an offset of the era. For example, the Gregorian year 2007 corresponds to Heisei 19. An era does not necessarily begin on 1 January. For example, 7 January Shōwa 64—the day of the death of Emperor Shōwa—was followed by 8 January Heisei 1, which lasted until 31 December.

=== Korea ===
Korea started using the Gregorian calendar on 1 January 1896, which was the 17th day of the 11th lunar month in not only Korea, but also in China that still used the lunisolar calendar. The lunisolar Korean calendar is now used in very limited unofficial purposes only.

=== China ===
The Republic of China (ROC) started using the Gregorian calendar on 1 January 1912, but the lunisolar Chinese calendar is still used along with the Gregorian calendar, especially when determining certain traditional holidays. The reference has been a longitude of 120°E since 1929, which is also used for Chinese Standard Time (UTC+8). Mainland China, Hong Kong, Macau, Malaysia, Indonesia, Singapore and Taiwan all have legal holidays based on the lunisolar Chinese calendar, with the most important one being the Chinese New Year.

From 1995, to visually distinguish old and new style dates, writing new style dates with Arabic numerals but old style dates with Chinese characters (never Arabic numerals) was the standard in the People's Republic of China (PRC). Since 1 November 2011, writing old style dates with Chinese characters, never Arabic numerals, remains the standard in the PRC, but new style dates may be written with either Arabic or Chinese numerals.

In Taiwan, even though new style dates are written in Chinese characters in very formal texts, it is now common to see Arabic numerals in new style dates in less formal texts. When writing old style dates, Chinese characters are usually used, but Arabic numerals may still be seen. (Note: In Taiwan, the Central Weather Bureau used to issue lunisolar calendars in Chinese characters through 2008, but Arabic numerals from 2009 to 2014.) The calendar year in Taiwan is usually expressed as the "Year of the Republic" — counting Year 1 as the foundation of the Republic of China in 1912 CE, so the current Gregorian year 2026 corresponds to the ROC year 115.

== Use of dates from historical documents in modern documents ==
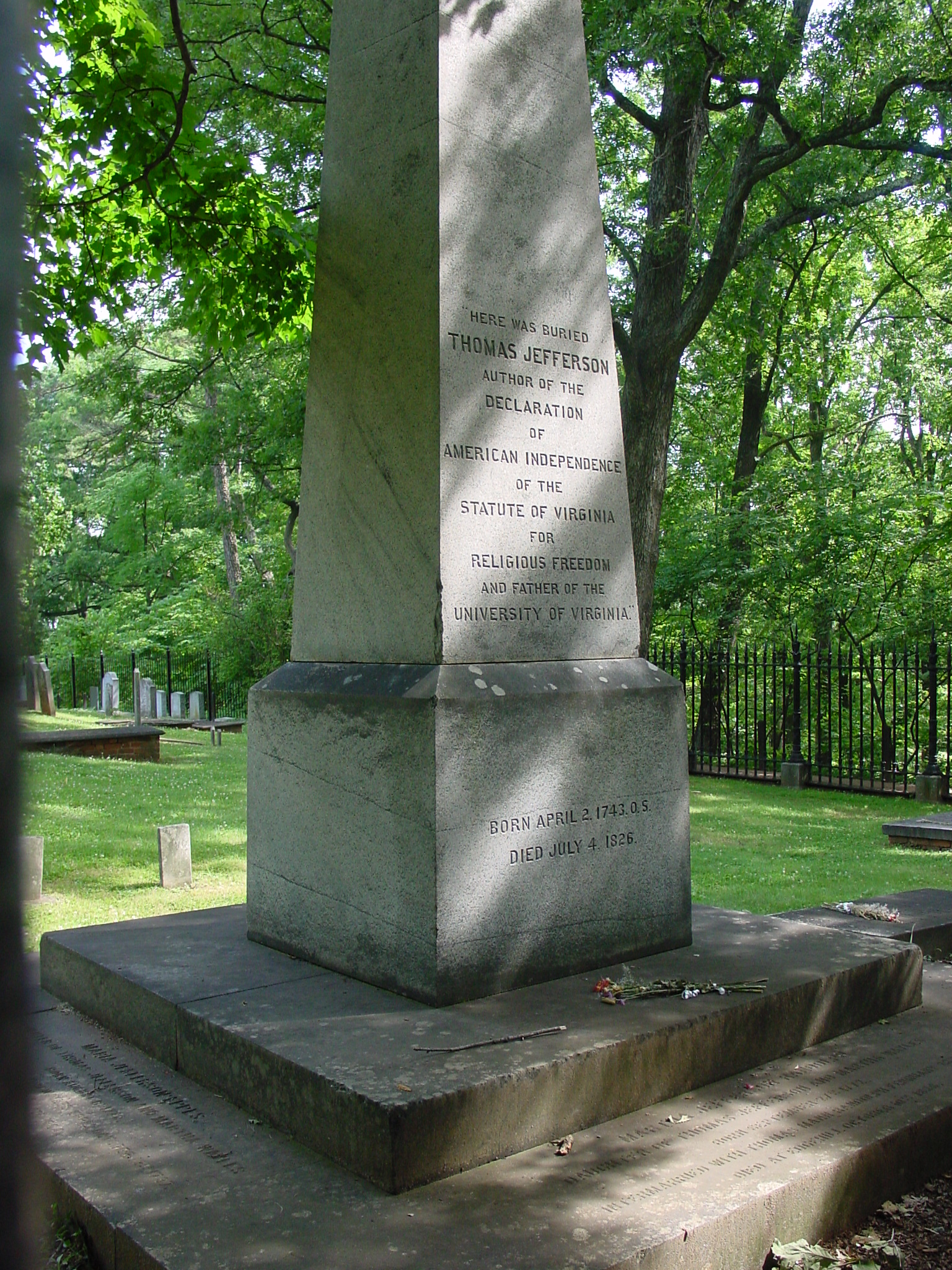
Thomas Jefferson's tombstone. Written below the epitaph is "BORN APRIL 2 1743 O.S. DIED JULY 4 1826"

There was some confusion when calendars changed, and the confusion may continue today when evaluating historical sources. When 'translating' dates from secondary historical sources for current use, for dates in January, February and March it is advised that both year numbers be entered into modern documents until a copy of the original primary source can be checked, verifying which style was used in the 'official record'. Errors were often made in the early 19th century and have been perpetuated.

In either case, to avoid further confusion, modern researchers are advised to be vigilant about annotating all dates with a notation indicating the Style of date, and to use a slash rather than a hyphen to indicate alternate dates.

== See also ==
- World Calendar – Proposed reform of Gregorian calendar
- Calculation of Julian day – Days since the beginning of the Julian Period
- Calendar reform – Significant revision of a calendar system
- Date of Easter#Gregorian reform of the computus
- Old Calendarists – Group of traditionalist Eastern Orthodox bodies
- List of calendars
- International Fixed Calendar – another calendar reform proposal
