= Inter gravissimas =

Introduction of the Gregorian calendar

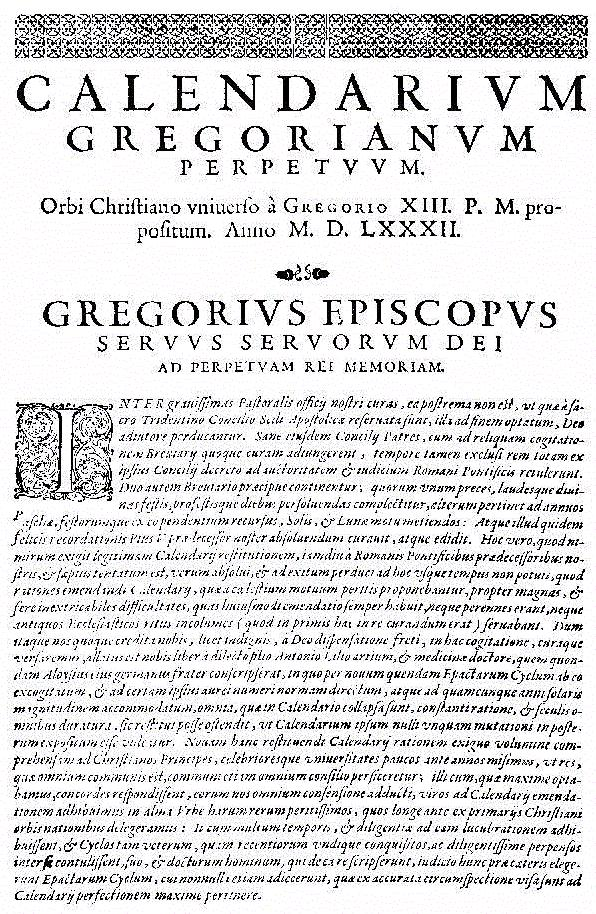
The first page of the papal bull Inter Gravissimas

Inter gravissimas (English: "Among the most serious...") was a papal bull issued by Pope Gregory XIII on 24 February 1582. The document, written in Latin, reformed the Julian calendar. The reform has conventionally come to be regarded as a new calendar in its own right, called the Gregorian calendar, named after Pope Gregory XIII. In the realm of orthodox christendom whose liturgical cycles did not apply the Inter gravissimas, the reformed calendar is noted as the New Style. The reformed Julian Calendar is used in most countries today, relatively independent of religious orientation of its populaces.

== Description ==
The intention expressed by the text of this bull was "to restore" the calendar so that seasonal events critical for the calculation of Easter dates would be back in their "proper places" and would be prevented from being moved away again. The idea of reform as such is not otherwise mentioned. The bull identifies "three necessary" things for the correct determination of Easter dates: correct placement of the northern vernal equinox; correct identification of the "14th day of the moon" (effectively full moon) that happens on or next after the vernal equinox, and the first Sunday that follows that full moon. The first two items were the ones that received attention; the third, about choosing the next following Sunday, was not identified as causing any problem, and was not further mentioned.

By "restore", Gregory meant two things. First, he adjusted the calendar so that the vernal equinox was near March 21, where it had been during the Council of Nicaea (20 May– 25 August 325). This required removing ten days of drift. Second, he made the tabular 14th day of the moon correspond with the real full moon, removing "four days and more" of drift. This would restore the dates of Easter to near where they were at the time of the Council of Nicaea, although that council had not specified where in the calendar the vernal equinox should fall and had not adopted any particular type of lunar tables. The practices of the Roman Catholic Church that had become traditional by 1582 for calculating the Easter and lunar calendars became settled when Dionysius Exiguus translated the rules of the Church of Alexandria from Greek into Latin in 525. (Northumbria adopted them at Whitby in 664, the Welsh around 768, and France around 775. Before this, France and Rome had used Victorius's less exact 457 translation of the Coptic calendar; Britain and Rome before Victorius had used Augustalis's 84-year cycle.)

Gregory also made changes to the calendar rules, intending to ensure that, in the future, the equinox and the 14th day of the Paschal moon, and consequently Easter Sunday, would not move away again from what the bull called their proper places.

The changes (relative to the Julian calendar) were as follows:

1. Reduction of the number of leap years – centennial years, such as 1700, 1800, and 1900 ceased to be leap years, but years that can be divided by 400, such as 1600 and 2000 continued to be;
2. Turning back extra days – 4 October 1582, was to be followed by 15 October 1582, and these 10 missing days were not to be counted in calculating end days of loans, taxes etc.;
3. Easter was to be computed with reference not only to the new 21 March, but also by the use of new Paschal tables.

The name of the bull consists of the first two words of the bull, which starts: "Inter gravissimas pastoralis officii nostri curas..." ("Among the most serious duties of our pastoral office...").

The bull refers to "the explanation of our calendar" and to a canon related to the dominical letter. To accompany the bull there were six chapters of explanatory rules ('canons'), and some of these (canons 1, 2, 4) refer to a book entitled Liber novæ rationis restituendi calendarii Romani for a fuller explanation of the tables than that contained in the canons (or the bull). Because the bull and canons refer to each other, they must have been written at roughly the same time, printed at the same time (1 March), and distributed to the several countries together.

These canons enabled the computation of Easter dates in the reformed ('restored') Gregorian calendar, and gave two calendar-listings saints' days, one for the 'year of correction' (1582) and another for the entire new Gregorian year. The bull, canons, and calendars were reprinted as part of the principal book explaining and defending the Gregorian calendar, Christoph Clavius, Romani calendarii a Gregorio XIII. P. M. restituti explicatio (1603), which is tome V in his collected works Opera Mathematica (1612).

== Date ==
The version of Inter gravissimas included by Christoph Clavius in his work explaining the Gregorian calendar contained these dating clauses: "Anno Incarnationis Dominicae M. D. LXXXI. Sexto Calend. Martij, Pontificatus nostri Anno Decimo. ... Anno à Natiuitate Domini nostri Iesu Christi Millesimo Quingentesimo Octuagesimo secundo Indictione decima,". These clauses include four years:

- "Anno Incarnationis Dominicae M. D. LXXXI." (In the year of the Incarnation of the Lord 1581) is the year beginning 25 March 1581. 25 March is the traditional date of the conception, annunciation, and incarnation of Jesus.
- "Sexto Calend. Martij" (On the sixth [day] before the Kalends [1st] of March.) The Romans counted inclusively; modern usage would say the fifth day before 1 March, or 24 February.
- "Pontificatus nostri Anno Decimo" (In the tenth year of our pontificate) is the year beginning 13 May 1581. Gregory XIII was elected pope on 13 May 1572 (in terms of the Julian calendar).
- "Anno à Natiuitate Domini nostri Iesu Christi Millesimo Quingentesimo Octuagesimo secundo" (In the year from the Nativity of our Lord Jesus Christ 1582) is the year beginning 25 December 1581 using the modern 1 January beginning of the year. It marks the beginning of year 1582 if that year began on 25 December, the traditional date of the birth or nativity of Jesus.
- "Indictione decima" (Indiction 10) is the year beginning 1 January, which agrees with modern reckoning.

All of these years agree that the bull was dated 24 February 1582, using the modern 1 January beginning of the year.

== Adoption ==
Gregory's reform was enacted in the most solemn of forms available to the Church, but the bull had no authority beyond the Catholic Church and the Papal States. The changes which Gregory was proposing included changes to the civil calendar over which Gregory had no authority (except in the Papal States). The text of the bull recognized this by giving what amounted to orders to the clergy and those "presiding over churches": but in contrast, where the text addresses the civil authorities ("kings, princes and republics"), it "asks", "exhorts" and "recommends" the new calendar changes. The changes required adoption by the civil authorities in each country to have legal effect.

The bull Inter gravissimas was immediately adopted by the major Catholic powers of Europe, but the Protestant countries refused to adopt it until the 18th century, and Eastern European countries adopted it only during or after World War I (the last European country to adopt it was Greece, in 1923).

Most Eastern Orthodox Churches and Oriental Orthodox Churches have not adopted it at all and continue to reckon their ecclesiastical years by the Julian calendar, even though their home countries use the Gregorian calendar for civil purposes.

== Contents of the bull ==
1. Council of Trent (1545–1563) authorizing the question of the authority and judgment to the Roman Pope.
2. The question is that holidays, especially Easter, are celebrated on the correct days in relation to the moon and sun
3. The predecessor Pope Pius V has regulated the holidays of the church year
4. This naturally requires a legitimate restoration of the calendar
5. Antonius Lilius, doctor of arts and medicine, as his brother Aloysius Lilius has prepared the proposal accepted on referral
6. The aim is to restore Easter in accordance with the Council of Nicaea to the first Sunday after the full moon after the spring equinox
  1. Correct placement of the vernal equinox, that the astronomical vernal equinox falls on March 21
  2. Correct placement of the full moon (the fourteenth day of the moon) either occurs on the day of the vernal equinox itself or is the next one following
  3. The first Sunday following the same full moon
7. Therefore, 10 days are removed, October 5-14, 1582
  1. To restore the vernal equinox to its original place from which it has already retreated by about ten days since the Council of Nicaea
  2. To restore the fourteenth day of Easter (full moon) of the moon to its place
  3. But also a method and a rule, to prevent the vernal equinox and the full moon from ever being moved away from their proper places in the future
8. Contracts and agreements extending over the removed days are extended by 10 days
9. Leap day is inserted as February 29 every even 4th year, but not every 100th but every 400th year
10. That the previous table system for the vernal equinox and full moon is replaced by the correct days in relation to the moon and sun
11. How the cyclus litterarum dominicalium XXVIII annorum, the cycle of Sunday letters, is to be handled
12. That the change is an order from the Pope
13. He who Breaking the bull by pressure is punished with a fine or by excommunication
14. Instruction to the representatives of the Church
15. Demand that kings, princes and republics under the Pope's domain apply the bull
16. Demand for the announcement and dissemination of the bull
17. Whoever does not follow the bull must know that they will incur the indignation of Almighty God and the blessed apostles Peter and Paul.
