= Robert Poole (historian) =

UK-based historian (born 1957)

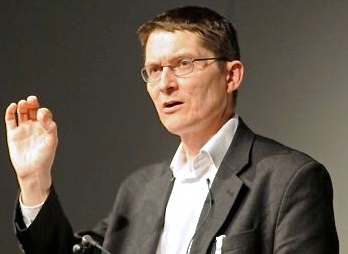
Robert Poole

Robert Poole (born 1957) is a UK-based historian, currently professor of history at the University of Central Lancashire, Preston. He gained his PhD from the University of Lancaster in 1986, where he was associated with Prof Harold Perkin's Centre for Social History, organising the 1996 conference of the Social History Society on 'Time and the Construction of the Past'. He has also held positions at the universities of Keele, Edge Hill and Cumbria. He has also been Leverhulme Senior Visiting Research Fellow at the University of Manchester (2000–01), an associate of the Centre for the History of Science, Technology and Medicine, University of Manchester (2010–17), an associate of 'The Future in the Stars' research programme, Friedrich-Meinecke Institut, Freie Universität Berlin (2012–16), and visiting senior research fellow to the History Group, University of Hertfordshire (2013–15).

== Earthrise and the space age ==
Poole's book Earthrise: How Man First Saw the Earth (Yale University Press, 2008), a study of the first views of Earth from space and their impact, has been identified as one of the key works of the 'new aerospace history'. He has lectured on 'Earthrise' and the cultural history of the space age in London, Washington, D.C., Lucerne, Paris, Berlin, and Copenhagen, broadcast on American public radio networks, and in July 2009 wrote the op-ed piece for the Los Angeles Times on the fortieth anniversary of the Lunar landing in July 1969 by Apollo 11. Subsequent articles have explored the science fiction writer and techno-prophet Arthur C. Clarke, '2001: a Space Odyssey and the Dawn of Man' in the 2015 collection Stanley Kubrick: New Perspectives, and the myth of progress in '2001: a Space Odyssey'. Another recent article, 'What was Whole about the Whole Earth?', provides a missing chapter to Earthrise. In early 2016 he enjoyed a Short-Term Visitor Award at the Smithsonian Institution, National Air and Space Museum, to look at the recently acquired papers of Arthur C. Clarke.

== Peterloo and popular protest ==
Poole's Peterloo: the English Uprising, (OUP, 2019) is an account of the 1819 Peterloo massacre in Manchester, on which he has written articles in Past and Present, History, Labour History Review, and edited collections. He is historical adviser to the Peterloo 2019 commemoration programme, run jointly by Manchester Histories and the People's History Museum, and to the 2017–18 community project by ReelMcr, 'Our Sam, Middleton man'. He was instrumental in bringing to the John Rylands Library a full set of the radical newspaper the Manchester Observer (1818–22), now freely available online as part of the library's Peterloo collection. He has given numerous public lectures and workshops, including the Manchester Histories Festivals and the 2018 BBC Civilisations festival, and is an active member of the Peterloo Memorial Campaign. His broadcast appearances include The Matter of the North episode 7 'The Radical North' (BBC R4 2016), Elegance and Decadence: the Age of the Regency episode 3 (BBC Four, 2011), How the North was Built Part 1 (ITV, 2013), The Real Mill (Channel 4, 2014), and the BBC Schools Programme Exploring the Past (2015). He edited a volume of the Manchester Region History Review, Return to Peterloo, contributing essays including 'What Don't We Know About Peterloo?'. . It will be followed by a biography of the Lancashire radical Samuel Bamford, on whom he has written several articles (some of them available online), and whose remarkable diaries he edited with Martin Hewitt for Sutton/St Martin's Press in 2000.

== Early modern England ==
In 2011 Poole produced a modern edition of The Wonderful Discovery of Witches in the County of Lancaster (Carnegie, 2011), the original 1612 account of the trial of the Lancashire (or Pendle) witches. The introduction gave the definitive account of England's biggest peacetime witch trial, summarised in an essay for the Public Domain Review. He was historical adviser to the Lancashire Witches 400 commemoration programme, including a long-distance walking trail featured in BBC History magazine, and to the subsequent Documenting Dissent project about prisoners of conscience at Lancaster Castle. He also edited "The Lancashire Witches: Histories and Stories" (Manchester University Press 2002), a multidisciplinary book of essays. He has also written "Time's Alteration: Calendar Reform In Early Modern England" (UCL Press/Taylor and Francis, London, 1998), which explains the British calendar reform of 1752 and refutes the myth of riots over the missing eleven days. He explained this on the BBC Radio 4 programme 'In Our Time'. He has contributed two articles to the Oxford Dictionary of National Biography: John Collier ('Tim Bobbin') 1708–1786, and William Holder 1616–1698).
