= Civil calendar =

Calendar used within a country for civil, official, or administrative purposes

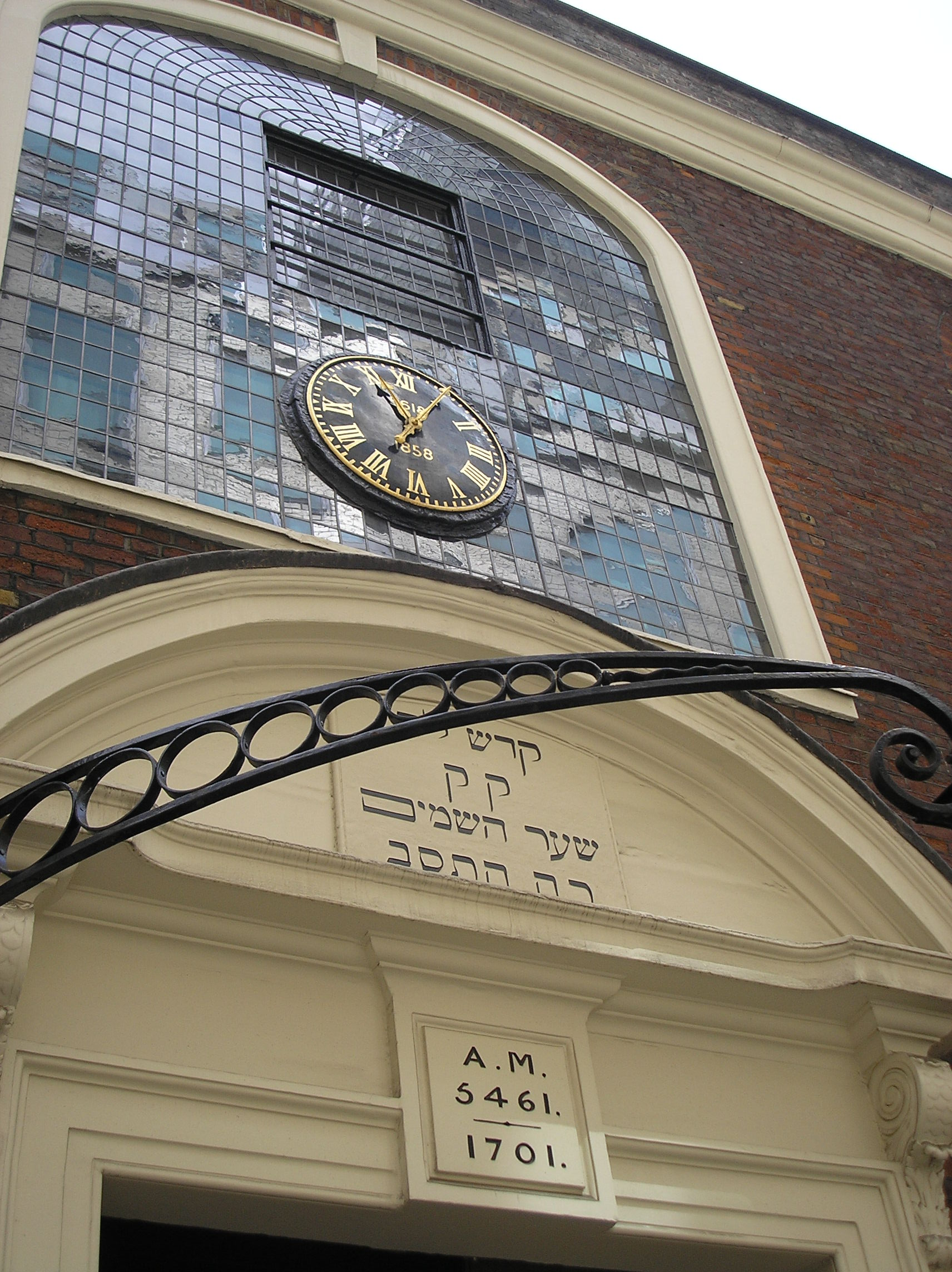
The inscription over the Bevis Marks Synagogue, City of London, gives the year 5461 in Anno Mundi and 1701 in civil calendar dating.

The civil calendar is the calendar, or possibly one of several calendars, used within a country for civil, official, or administrative purposes. The civil calendar is almost always used for general purposes by people and private organizations.

The most widespread civil calendar and de facto international standard is the Gregorian calendar. Although that calendar was first declared by Pope Gregory XIII to be used in Catholic countries in 1582, it has since been adopted, as a matter of convenience, by many secular and non-Christian countries, although some countries use other calendars.

== Civil calendars worldwide ==
168 of the world's countries use the Gregorian calendar as their sole civil calendar as of 2021. Most non-Christian countries have adopted it as a result of colonization, with some cases of voluntary adoption.

Four countries have not adopted the Gregorian calendar: Afghanistan and Iran (which use the Solar Hijri calendar), Ethiopia (the Ethiopian calendar), and Nepal (Vikram Samvat and Nepal Sambat).

Three countries use a modified version of the Gregorian calendar (with eras different from Anno Domini): Japan (Japanese calendar), Taiwan (Minguo calendar), and Thailand (Thai solar calendar). In the former two countries, the Anno Domini era is also in use. South Korea previously used the Korean calendar from 1945 to 1961. North Korea used the North Korean calendar from 1997 but ceased its use in October 2024.

Eighteen countries use another calendar alongside the Gregorian calendar:

- Algeria, Iraq, Jordan, Libya, Mauritania, Morocco, Oman, Pakistan, Saudi Arabia, Somalia, Tunisia, United Arab Emirates, and Yemen (Lunar Hijri calendar),
- Bangladesh (Bengali calendar),
- Egypt (Lunar Hijri calendar and Coptic calendar),
- India (Indian national calendar),
- Israel (Hebrew calendar),
- Myanmar (Burmese calendar).

== See also ==
- List of calendars
- Chinese calendar
- Persian calendar
