= Sphere Packings, Lattices and Groups =

1988 mathematical book

Sphere Packings, Lattices and Groups is a book about geometry and group theory by John Conway and Neil Sloane, with contributions by other mathematicians, first published in 1988.

H. S. M. Coxeter noted, "Much of the book is inspired by the Leech lattice." The book covers many results that, as Richard K. Guy phrased it, "appear little short of miraculous", such as how the Leech lattice, a set of points in 24-dimensional space, is related via special relativity to stacking cannonballs. The interrelated topics featured in the book include Golay codes, Mathieu groups and Monstrous Moonshine. Many of the chapters are updates of papers that had been published in journals previously. Portions of the text were coauthored by Eiichi Bannai, Richard Borcherds, John Leech, Simon Norton, Andrew M. Odlyzko, Richard A. Parker, Larissa Queen and B. B. Venkov.

Francis Fung called it "monumental", and Nick Lord described it as "epochal". Gian-Carlo Rota wrote:

This is the best survey of the best work in the best fields of combinatorics written by the best people. It will make the best reading by the best students interested in the best mathematics that is now going on.

== Editions ==
The book is volume 290 in Springer's Grundlehren der mathematischen Wissenschaften series.

- Sphere Packings, Lattices and Groups (1st ed.). Springer-Verlag. 1988. ISBN 0-387-96617-X. MR 0920369.
- Sphere Packings, Lattices and Groups (2nd ed.). Springer-Verlag. 1993. ISBN 9780387979120.
- Sphere Packings, Lattices and Groups (3rd ed.). Springer-Verlag. 1998. doi:10.1007/978-1-4757-6568-7. ISBN 9780387985855.
- Russian translation, by S. N. Litsyn, M. A. Tsfasman and G. B. Shabat; Mir Publishers, Moscow, 1990. Volume 1: ISBN 9785030023687 MR 1148591; volume 2: ISBN 9785030023694 MR 1148592.
