= M13 =

M13, M-13 or M_{13} may refer to:

== Military ==
- Fiat M13/40, an Italian tank used in World War II
- M13 Half-track, a U.S. anti-aircraft gun used in World War II
- M13 link, a machine gun's ammunition link
- M-13 rocket, a version of the Soviet World War II RS-82 rocket
- M13 revolver, a lightweight version of either the Smith & Wesson Model 12 or the Colt Cobra pistol for U.S. Air Force crews

== Roads ==
- Highway M13 (Ukraine), an international highway connecting Ukraine and Moldova
- M-13 (Michigan highway), a state highway in the United States
- M13 (East London), a Metropolitan Route in East London, South Africa
- M13 (Cape Town), a Metropolitan Route in Cape Town, South Africa
- M13 (Johannesburg), a Metropolitan Route in Johannesburg, South Africa
- M13 (Pretoria), a Metropolitan Route in Pretoria, South Africa
- M13 (Durban), a Metropolitan Route in Durban, South Africa
- M13 (Bloemfontein), a Metropolitan Route in Bloemfontein, South Africa
- M13 (Port Elizabeth), a Metropolitan Route in Port Elizabeth, South Africa
- M13 road (Zambia), a road in Zambia

== Other uses ==
- M13 (Istanbul Metro), a rapid transit rail line in Istanbul Turkey
- M_{13}, the Mathieu groupoid by John Horton Conway
- M13 bacteriophage, a virus that infects bacteria
- Magic 2013, the fourteenth core set in Magic: The Gathering
- Messier 13, a globular cluster in the constellation Hercules
- Miles M.13 Hobby, an airplane built by Miles Aircraft
- Samsung Galaxy M13, an Android-based smartphone manufactured by Samsung Electronics
