= Nebe =

Nebe is a German surname. Notable people with the surname include:

- Arthur Nebe (1894–1945), German SS general and Holocaust perpetrator
- Gabriele Nebe (born 1967), German mathematician
- Herbert Nebe (1899–1985), German road bicycle racer

== See also ==
- Nebe is also the Czech word for "heaven"
- National Election Board of Ethiopia, whose acronym is NEBE
