= Richard A. Parker =

British mathematician

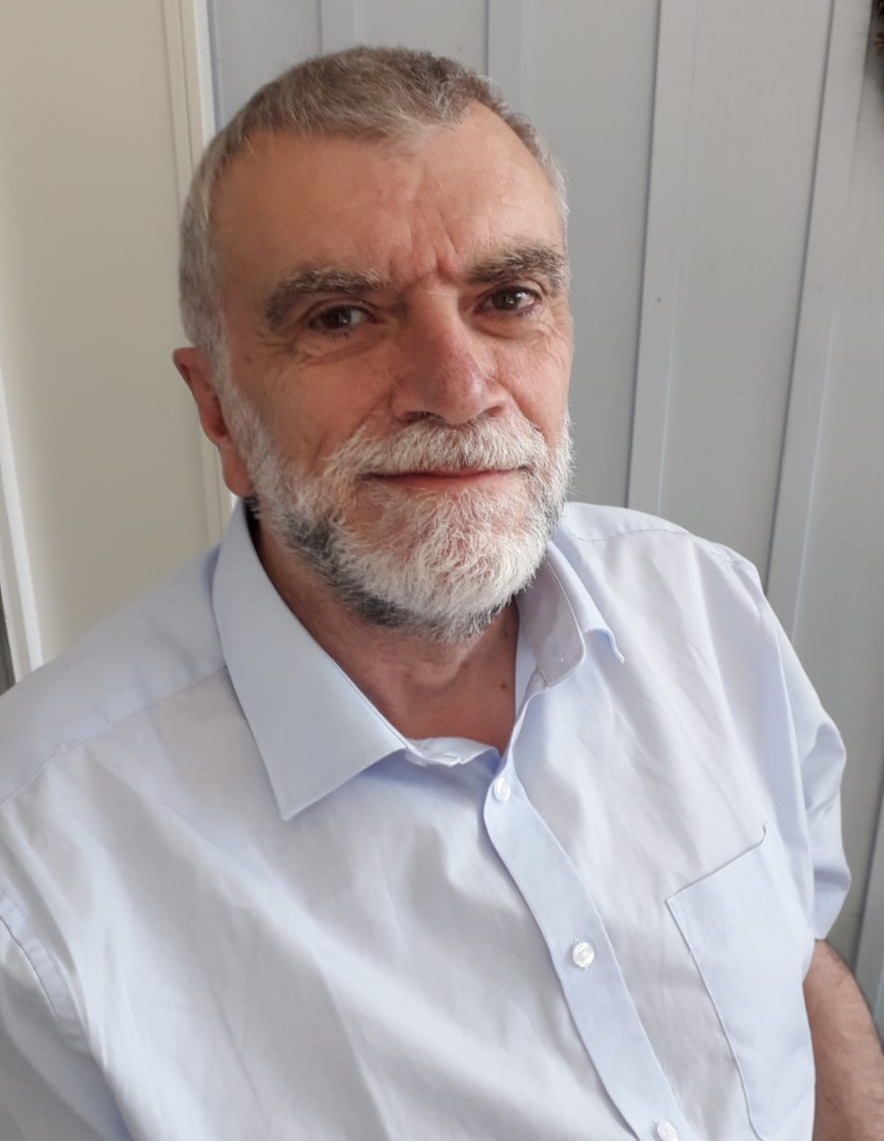
Richard A. Parker

Richard A. Parker (29 January 1953 – 26 January 2024) was a mathematician and freelance computer programmer born in Surrey who lived for much of his life in Cambridge, England. He invented many of the algorithms for computing the modular character tables of finite simple groups. He discovered the relation between Niemeier lattices and deep holes of the Leech lattice, and constructed Parker's Moufang loop of order 2^{13} (which was used by John Horton Conway in his construction of the monster group).

== Books ==
- Conway, J. H.; Sloane, N. J. A. (1999). Sphere packings, lattices and groups. (3rd ed.) With additional contributions by E. Bannai, R. E. Borcherds, John Leech, Simon P. Norton, A. M. Odlyzko, R. A. Parker, L. Queen and B. B. Venkov. Grundlehren der Mathematischen Wissenschaften, 290. New York: Springer-Verlag. ISBN 0-387-98585-9.
- Conway, John Horton; Curtis, Robert Turner; Norton, Simon Phillips; Parker, Richard A; Wilson, Robert Arnott (1985). Atlas of finite groups: maximal subgroups and ordinary characters for simple groups. Oxford University Press. ISBN 0-19-853199-0.
- An Atlas of Brauer Characters (London Mathematical Society Monographs) by Christopher Jansen, Klaus Lux, Richard Parker, Robert Wilson. Oxford University Press, U.S. (October 1, 1995) ISBN 0-19-851481-6
