= Norman Routledge =

English mathematician and schoolteacher

Norman Arthur Routledge
- Still image from a video of Routledge talking on the Eton College Headmaster Robert Birley
- Born: 7 March 1928; London, England
- Died: 27 April 2013 (aged 85); London, England
- Education: Letchworth Grammar School
- Alma mater: King's College, Cambridge
- Known for: Recursive sets
- Scientific career
- Fields: Mathematics
- Workplaces: Royal Aircraft Establishment, National Physical Laboratory, King's College, Cambridge, Eton College
- Thesis: Recursive Sets (1954)

Norman Arthur Routledge (7 March 1928 – 27 April 2013) was a British mathematician and schoolteacher. He was a personal friend of fellow mathematician Alan Turing (1912–1954).

== Life and career ==
Norman Routledge was born near Alexandra Park, north London, England. He was about to begin secondary education at Glendale County School, Wood Green, in 1939, when the outbreak of World War II intervened. He was evacuated with his mother, going to live in Letchworth with an aunt, and attending Letchworth Grammar School, where he was taught mathematics by George Braithwaite.

In 1946 Routledge matriculated with a scholarship at King's College, Cambridge, where he read mathematics. He was supervised by Albert Ingham and Philip Hall. He gained a first class degree in 1949 and went on to research in recursion theory. It resulted in the papers Ordinal recursion (1953) and Concerning definable sets (1954).

Routledge taught as a scientific officer at the Royal Aircraft Establishment, RAE Farnborough. He went on to the National Physical Laboratory (NPL), Teddington. These were placements to fulfil the requirements for his compulsory national service. At the NPL in 1952 he was able to become an operator of an early version of the Automatic Computing Engine: the Pilot ACE project supported by Harry Huskey's prototype assembler.

Returning to academia, Routledge became a research fellow in mathematics at King's College, Cambridge. He taught college undergraduates, and after a time was a director of studies. In 1957, he was photographed by Antony Barrington Brown. The photograph is now in the collection of the National Portrait Gallery, London.

In 1959, Robert Birley, headmaster at Eton College, asked Routledge for a recommendation of some promising student for a mathematics teaching post; and he suggested himself. He taught mathematics at the school for some years and was later a housemaster. He was considered an inspirational teacher, teaching among other Etonians Simon P. Norton, Timothy Gowers and Stephen Wolfram. Later in his life, he taught music for the Salvation Army community in Bermondsey, southeast London.

Routledge was a raconteur, including on his personal life. In retirement towards the end of his own life, he was able to be more openly gay.

In Turing's biography, Routledge is described as "clever, flamboyant and sometimes outrageous".

== Association with Alan Turing ==
Routledge was a friend of the mathematician and codebreaker Alan Turing, whom he met after World War II, when Turing was in Cambridge to study physiology. Turing wrote personal letters to Routledge towards the end of his life. After his arrest and before his trial, he sent the following cryptic syllogism to Routledge in 1952:

Turing believes that machines think
Turing lies with men
Therefore machines cannot think

The 1992 documentary programme The Strange Life and Death of Dr Turing had Routledge as one of the interviewees.

== Selected publications ==
- Routledge, N. A. (1952). "A result in Hilbert space". The Quarterly Journal of Mathematics. 3 (1): 12–18. doi:10.1093/qmath/3.1.12.
- Routledge, N. A. (April 1953). "Ordinal recursion". Mathematical Proceedings of the Cambridge Philosophical Society. 49 (2): 175–182. Bibcode:1953PCPS...49..175R. doi:10.1017/S0305004100028255. S2CID 251094316.

== Bibliography ==
- Copeland, B. Jack; Bowen, Jonathan P.; Wilson, Robin; Sprevak, Mark (2017). The Turing Guide. Oxford University Press. pp. 37, 44, 471. ISBN 978-0-19-874783-3.
- Hodges, Andrew (1983). Alan Turing: The Enigma. Simon & Schuster. pp. 372, 395, 476, 483. ISBN 0-671-49207-1.
- Leavitt, David (2006). The Man Who Knew Too Much: Alan Turing and the Invention of the Computer. Weidenfeld & Nicolson. pp. 5, 25, 265, 268, 270, 271. ISBN 978-0-7538-2200-5.
- Turing, Dermot (2015). Alan Turing Decoded. The History Press. pp. 246–247. ISBN 978-1-84165-643-4.
