= FRACTRAN =

Turing-complete esoteric programming language invented by John Conway

FRACTRAN is a Turing-complete esoteric programming language invented by the mathematician John Conway. A FRACTRAN program is an ordered list of positive fractions together with an initial positive integer input n. The program is run by updating the integer n as follows:

1. for the first fraction f in the list for which nf is an integer, replace n by nf
2. repeat this rule until no fraction in the list produces an integer when multiplied by n, then halt.

The name FRACTRAN is a portmanteau of "fraction" and the programming language FORTRAN.

Conway 1987 gives the following FRACTRAN program, called PRIMEGAME, which finds successive prime numbers:

$$\left( \frac{17}{91}, \frac{78}{85}, \frac{19}{51}, \frac{23}{38}, \frac{29}{33}, \frac{77}{29}, \frac{95}{23}, \frac{77}{19}, \frac{1}{17}, \frac{11}{13}, \frac{13}{11}, \frac{15}{2}, \frac{1}{7}, \frac{55}{1} \right)$$

Starting with n = 2, this FRACTRAN program generates the following sequence of integers:

- 2, 15, 825, 725, 1925, 2275, 425, 390, 330, 290, 770, … (sequence A007542 in the OEIS), i.e. the sequence of PRIMEGAME numbers

After 2, this sequence contains the following powers of 2 in order:

$$2^2=4,\, 2^3=8,\, 2^5=32,\, 2^7=128,\, 2^{11}=2048,\, 2^{13}=8192,\, 2^{17}=131072,\, 2^{19}=524288,\,  \dots$$
(sequence A034785 in the OEIS)

The exponent part of these powers of two are primes, 2, 3, 5, etc.

== Understanding a FRACTRAN program ==
A FRACTRAN program can be seen as a type of register machine where the registers are stored in prime exponents in the argument n.

Using Gödel numbering, a positive integer n can encode an arbitrary number of arbitrarily large positive integer variables. (Note: Gödel numbering cannot be directly used for negative integers, floating point numbers or text strings, although conventions could be adopted to represent these data types indirectly. Proposed extensions to FRACTRAN include FRACTRAN++ and Bag.) The value of each variable is encoded as the exponent of a prime number in the prime factorization of the integer. For example, the integer

$$60 = 2^2 \times 3^1 \times 5^1$$

represents a register state in which one variable (which we will call v_{2}) holds the value 2 and two other variables (v_{3} and v_{5}) hold the value 1. All other variables hold the value 0.

A FRACTRAN program is an ordered list of positive fractions. Each fraction represents an instruction that tests one or more variables, represented by the prime factors of its denominator. For example:

$$f_1 = \frac{21}{20} = \frac{3 \times 7}{2^2 \times 5^1}$$

tests v_{2} and v_{5}. If v_{2} ≥ 2 and v_{5} ≥ 1, then it subtracts 2 from v_{2} and 1 from v_{5}, and adds 1 to v_{3} and 1 to v_{7}. For example:

$$60 \cdot f_1 = 2^2 \times 3^1 \times 5^1 \cdot \frac{3 \times 7}{2^2 \times 5^1} = 3^2 \times 7^1 = 63$$

Since the FRACTRAN program is just a list of fractions, these test–decrement–increment instructions are the only allowed instructions in the FRACTRAN language. In addition the following restrictions apply:

- Each time an instruction is executed, the variables that are tested are also decremented.
- The same variable cannot be both decremented and incremented in a single instruction (otherwise the fraction representing that instruction would not be in its lowest terms). Therefore each FRACTRAN instruction consumes variables as it tests them.
- It is not possible for a FRACTRAN instruction to directly test if a variable is 0. However, an indirect test can be implemented by creating a default instruction (a fraction with a denominator of 1) that is placed after other instructions that test a particular variable.

== Creating simple programs ==
=== Addition ===
The simplest FRACTRAN program is a single instruction such as

$$\left( \frac{3}{2} \right)$$

This program can be represented as a (very simple) algorithm as follows:

| FRACTRAN instruction | Condition | Action |
|---|---|---|
| $\frac{3}{2}$ | v_{2} > 0 | Subtract 1 from v_{2} Add 1 to v_{3} |
| | v_{2} = 0 | Stop |

Given an initial input of the form 2^{a} × 3^{b}, this program will compute the sequence 2^{a − 1} × 3^{b + 1}, 2^{a − 2} × 3^{b + 2}, and so on, until eventually, after a steps, no factors of 2 remain and the product with 3/2 no longer yields an integer; the program then stops with a final output of 3^{a + b}. It therefore adds the two integers a and b together.

=== Multiplication ===
We can create a "multiplier" by looping through the "adder". In order to do this we need to introduce states into our algorithm. This algorithm will take a number 2^{a} × 3^{b} and produce 5^{ab}:

| Current state | Condition | Action | Next state |
|---|---|---|---|
| A | v_{7} > 0 | Subtract 1 from v_{7} Add 1 to v_{3} | A |
| A | v_{7} = 0 and v_{2} > 0 | Subtract 1 from v_{2} | B |
| A | v_{7} = 0 and v_{2} = 0 and v_{3} > 0 | Subtract 1 from v_{3} | A |
| A | v_{7} = 0 and v_{2} = 0 and v_{3} = 0 | Stop | |
| B | v_{3} > 0 | Subtract 1 from v_{3} Add 1 to v_{5} Add 1 to v_{7} | B |
| B | v_{3} = 0 | None | A |

State B is a loop that adds v_{3} to v_{5} and also moves v_{3} to v_{7}, and state A is an outer control loop that repeats the loop in state B v_{2} times. State A also restores the value of v_{3} from v_{7} after the loop in state B has completed.

We can implement states using new variables as state indicators. The state indicators for state B will be v_{11} and v_{13}. Note that we require two state control indicators for one loop; a primary flag (v_{11}) and a secondary flag (v_{13}). Because each indicator is consumed whenever it is tested, we need a secondary indicator to say "continue in the current state"; this secondary indicator is swapped back to the primary indicator in the next instruction, and the loop continues.

Adding FRACTRAN state indicators and instructions to the multiplication algorithm table, we have:

| FRACTRAN instruction | Current state | State indicators | Condition | Action | Next state |
|---|---|---|---|---|---|
| $\frac{3}{7}$ | A | None | v_{7} > 0 | Subtract 1 from v_{7} Add 1 to v_{3} | A |
| $\frac{11}{2}$ | A | None | v_{7} = 0 and v_{2} > 0 | Subtract 1 from v_{2} | B |
| $\frac{1}{3}$ | A | None | v_{7} = 0 and v_{2} = 0 and v_{3} > 0 | Subtract 1 from v_{3} | A |
| | A | None | v_{7} = 0 and v_{2} = 0 and v_{3} = 0 | Stop | |
| $\frac{5 \cdot 7 \cdot 13}{3 \cdot 11}, \frac{11}{13}$ | B | v_{11}, v_{13} | v_{3} > 0 | Subtract 1 from v_{3} Add 1 to v_{5} Add 1 to v_{7} | B |
| $\frac{1}{11}$ | B | v_{11}, v_{13} | v_{3} = 0 | None | A |

When we write out the FRACTRAN instructions, we must put the state A instructions last, because state A has no state indicators—it is the default state if no state indicators are set. So as a FRACTRAN program, the multiplier becomes:

$$\left( \frac{455}{33}, \frac{11}{13}, \frac{1}{11}, \frac{3}{7}, \frac{11}{2}, \frac{1}{3} \right)$$

With input 2^{a} × 3^{b} this program produces output 5^{ab}. (Note: A similar multiplier algorithm is described at the Esolang FRACTRAN page.)

The above FRACTRAN program, computing 3 times 2 (so that its input is 2^{3} × 3^{2} = 72 and its output should be 5^{6} = 15625 because 3 times 2 equals 6.

=== Subtraction and division ===
In a similar way, we can create a FRACTRAN "subtractor", and repeated subtractions allow us to create a "quotient and remainder" algorithm as follows:

| FRACTRAN instruction | Current state | State indicators | Condition | Action | Next state |
|---|---|---|---|---|---|
| $\frac{7 \cdot 13}{2 \cdot 3 \cdot 11}, \frac{11}{13}$ | A | v_{11}, v_{13} | $v_2 > 0$ and $v_3 > 0$ | Subtract 1 from v_{2} Subtract 1 from v_{3} Add 1 to v_{7} | A |
| $\frac{1}{3 \cdot 11}$ | A | v_{11}, v_{13} | v_{2} = 0 and v_{3} > 0 | Subtract 1 from v_{3} | X |
| $\frac{5 \cdot 17}{11}$ | A | v_{11}, v_{13} | v_{3} = 0 | Add 1 to v_{5} | B |
| $\frac{3 \cdot 19}{7 \cdot 17}, \frac{17}{19}$ | B | v_{17}, v_{19} | v_{7} > 0 | Subtract 1 from v_{7} Add 1 to v_{3} | B |
| $\frac{11}{17}$ | B | v_{17}, v_{19} | v_{7} = 0 | None | A |
| $\frac{1}{3}$ | X | | v_{3} > 0 | Subtract 1 from v_{3} | X |
| | X | | v_{3} = 0 | Stop | |

Writing out the FRACTRAN program, we have:

$$\left( \frac{91}{66}, \frac{11}{13}, \frac{1}{33}, \frac{85}{11}, \frac{57}{119}, \frac{17}{19}, \frac{11}{17}, \frac{1}{3} \right)$$

and input 2^{n} × 3^{d} × 11 produces output 5^{q} × 7^{r} where n = qd + r and 0 ≤ r < d.

== Conway's prime algorithm ==
Conway's prime generating algorithm above is essentially a quotient and remainder algorithm within two loops. Given input of the form 2^{n} × 7^{m} where 0 ≤ m < n, the algorithm tries to divide n + 1 by each number from n down to 1, until it finds the largest number k that is a proper divisor of n + 1. It then returns 2^{n + 1} × 7^{k − 1} and repeats. The only times that the sequence of state numbers generated by the algorithm produces a power of 2 is when k = 1 (so that the exponent of 7 is 0), which only occurs if the exponent of 2, n + 1, is a prime. A step-by-step explanation of Conway's algorithm can be found in Havil (2007).

For this program, reaching the prime number 2, 3, 5, 7,… requires respectively 19, 69, 281, 710,… steps (sequence A007547 in the OEIS).

A variant of Conway's program also exists, which differs from the above version by two fractions:
$$\left( \frac{17}{91}, \frac{78}{85}, \frac{19}{51}, \frac{23}{38}, \frac{29}{33}, \frac{77}{29}, \frac{95}{23}, \frac{77}{19}, \frac{1}{17}, \frac{11}{13}, \frac{13}{11}, \frac{15}{14}, \frac{15}{2}, \frac{55}{1} \right)$$

This variant is a little faster: reaching 2, 3, 5, 7,… takes it 19, 69, 280, 707,… steps (sequence A007546 in the OEIS). A single iteration of this program, checking a particular number N for primeness, takes the following number of steps:
$$N - 1 + (6N+2)(N-b) + 2 \sum\limits^{N-1}_{d=b} \left\lfloor \frac{N}{d} \right\rfloor,$$
where b < N is the largest integer divisor of N and ⌊ x ⌋ is the floor function.

In 1999, Devin Kilminster demonstrated a shorter, ten-instruction program:
$$\left( \frac{7}{3}, \frac{99}{98}, \frac{13}{49}, \frac{39}{35}, \frac{36}{91}, \frac{10}{143}, \frac{49}{13}, \frac{7}{11}, \frac{1}{2}, \frac{91}{1} \right)$$
For the initial input n = 10, successive primes are generated by subsequent powers of 10.

== Other examples ==
The following FRACTRAN program:

$$\left( \frac{33}{20}, \frac{5}{11}, \frac{13}{10}, \frac{1}{5}, \frac{2}{3}, \frac{10}{7}, \frac{7}{2} \right)$$

calculates the Hamming weight H(a) of the binary expansion of a, that is, the number of 1s in the binary expansion of a. Given input 2^{a}, its output is 13^{H(a)}. The program can be analysed as follows:

| FRACTRAN instruction | Current state | State indicators | Condition | Action | Next state |
|---|---|---|---|---|---|
| $\frac{3 \cdot 11}{2^2 \cdot 5}, \frac{5}{11}$ | A | v_{5}, v_{11} | v_{2} > 1 | Subtract 2 from v_{2} Add 1 to v_{3} | A |
| $\frac{13}{2 \cdot 5}$ | A | v_{5}, v_{11} | v_{2} = 1 | Subtract 1 from v_{2} Add 1 to v_{13} | B |
| $\frac{1}{5}$ | A | v_{5}, v_{11} | v_{2} = 0 | None | B |
| $\frac{2}{3}$ | B | None | v_{3} > 0 | Subtract 1 from v_{3} Add 1 to v_{2} | B |
| $\frac{2 \cdot 5}{7}$ | B | None | v_{3} = 0 and v_{7} > 0 | Subtract 1 from v_{7} Add 1 to v_{2} | A |
| $\frac{7}{2}$ | B | None | v_{3} = 0 and v_{7} = 0 and v_{2} > 0 | Subtract 1 from v_{2} add 1 to v_{7} | B |
| | B | None | v_{2} = 0 and v_{3} = 0 and v_{7} = 0 | Stop | |

=== PIGAME ===
In Conway's original article from 1987, he also gave PIGAME (Theorem 2, page 5), a FRACTRAN program consisting of 40 fractions:
$$\begin{align}
&\left(\frac{365}{46},  \frac{29}{161},  \frac{79}{575},  \frac{679}{451},  \frac{3159}{413},
\frac{83}{407},  \frac{473}{371},  \frac{638}{355},  \frac{434}{335},  \frac{89}{235},
\frac{17}{209},  \frac{79}{122},  \frac{31}{183},  \frac{41}{115},  \frac{517}{89},
\frac{111}{83},  \frac{305}{79},  \right. \\[6pt]
&\qquad\left.
\frac{23}{73}, \frac{73}{71},  \frac{61}{67},
\frac{37}{61},  \frac{19}{59},  \frac{89}{57},  \frac{41}{53},  \frac{833}{47},
\frac{53}{43},  \frac{86}{41},  \frac{13}{38},  \frac{23}{37},  \frac{67}{31},
\frac{71}{29},  \frac{83}{19},  \frac{475}{17},  \frac{59}{13},  \frac{41}{291},
\frac{1}{7},  \frac{1}{11},  \frac{1}{1024},  \frac{1}{97},  \frac{89}{1} \right)
\end{align}$$
which can compute any decimal digit of the constant π: To get π(n), the nth decimal digit of π, where by convention the initial digit 3 corresponds to n = 0, PIGAME must be run starting with 2^{n} × 89. (Note: Not 2^{n} as incorrectly written in the paper.) Then, the first power of two appearing in the trajectory will be 2^{π(n)}. Indeed, when started with 89 (representing n = 0), the first power of two to appear, at the 775th iteration, is 8 = 2^{3}, corresponding to the initial digit 3 of π.

== See also ==
- One-instruction set computer
- Collatz conjecture
