= ATLAS of Finite Groups =

Mathematics book by John Conway

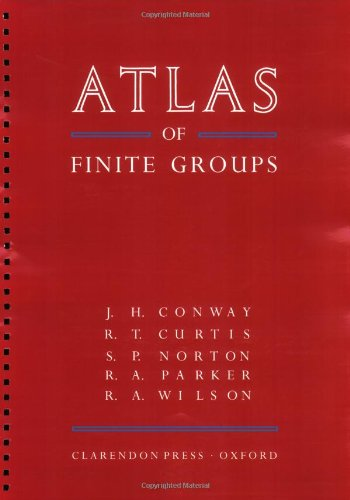
- ATLAS of Finite Groups distinctive red cardboard cover and spiral binding
- Author: J. H. Conway; R. T. Curtis; S. P. Norton; R. A. Parker; R. A. Wilson
- Subject: Group theory
- Publisher: Oxford University Press
- Publication date: December 1985
- Pages: 294
- ISBN: 978-0-19-853199-9

The ATLAS of Finite Groups, often simply known as the ATLAS, is a group theory book by John Horton Conway, Robert Turner Curtis, Simon Phillips Norton, Richard Alan Parker and Robert Arnott Wilson (with computational assistance from J. G. Thackray), published in December 1985 by Oxford University Press and reprinted with corrections in 2003 (ISBN 978-0-19-853199-9). The book codified and systematized mathematicians' knowledge about finite groups, including some discoveries that had only been known within Conway's group at Cambridge University. Over the years since its publication, it has proved to be a landmark work of mathematical exposition.

It lists basic information about 93 finite simple groups. The classification of finite simple groups indicates that any such group is either a member of an infinite family, such as the cyclic groups of prime order, or one of the 26 sporadic groups. The ATLAS covers all of the sporadic groups and the smaller examples of the infinite families. The authors said that their rule for choosing groups to include was to "think how far the reasonable person would go, and then go a step further." The information provided is generally a group's order, Schur multiplier, outer automorphism group, various constructions (such as presentations), conjugacy classes of maximal subgroups, and, most importantly, character tables (including power maps on the conjugacy classes) of the group itself and bicyclic extensions given by stem extensions and automorphism groups. In certain cases (such as for the Chevalley groups $E_n(2)$), the character table is not listed and only basic information is given.

The ATLAS is a recognizable large format book (sized 420 mm by 300 mm) with a red cardboard cover and spiral binding. (One later author described it as "appropriately oversized". Another noted that his university library shelved it among the oversized geography books.) The cover lists the authors in alphabetical order by last name, each name having six letters, which was also the order in which the authors joined the project. The abbreviations by which the authors refer to certain groups, which occasionally differ from those used by some other mathematicians, are known as "ATLAS notation".

The book was reappraised in 1995 in the volume The Atlas of Finite Groups: Ten Years on. It was the subject of an American Mathematical Society symposium at Princeton University in 2015, whose proceedings were published as Finite Simple Groups: Thirty Years of the Atlas and Beyond.

The ATLAS is being continued in the form of an electronic database, the ATLAS of Finite Group Representations.
