= Christian Zeller =

German mathematician

Julius Christian Johannes Zeller (24 June 1822, Mühlhausen am Neckar – 31 May 1899, Cannstatt) was a German mathematician. He was born to Gottlob Zeller and Christiana Friedrike Moser.

Originally trained in mathematics, geography and theology, in 1874 Zeller became Director of the Seminary in Markgröningen and a girls' orphanage. In 1882 he became a member of the Société Mathématique de France. The following year, on 16 March 1883, he delivered a short account of his congruence relation (Zeller's congruence), which was published in the society's journal.

He was later awarded the Order of Friedrich, First Class, and the Ritterkreuz of Württemberg. He retired in 1898, and died in the following summer.

== Works ==
=== On calendrical calculations ===
Each of these four similar papers deals firstly with the day of the week and secondly with the date of Easter Sunday, for the Julian and Gregorian Calendars.

- Die Grundaufgaben der Kalenderrechnung auf neue und vereinfachte Weise gelöst, Zeller, Chr., Württembergische Vierteljahrshefte für Landesgeschichte, Jahrgang V 1882.
- Problema duplex Calendarii fundamentale par M. Ch. Zeller, Bulletin de la Société Mathématique de France, vol.11, Séance du 16 mars 1883
- Kalender-Formeln von Rektor Chr. Zeller, Mathematisch-naturwissenschaftliche Mitteilungen des mathematisch-naturwissenschaftlichen Vereins in Württemberg, Ser. 1, 1 1885
- Kalender-Formeln von Chr. Zeller, Acta Mathematica, Vol. 9 1886–87, Nov 1886

He also produced a reference card, Das Ganze der Kalender-Rechnung.

=== On number theory ===
See number theory.

- Ein neuer Beweis des Reziprozitäts-Theorems, Berlin 1872
- De numeris Bernoulli eorumque compositione ex numeris integris et reciprocis primis, Paris 1881
- Zu Eulers Rekursionsformel für die Divisorensummen, Stockholm 1884
