= Doomsday rule =

Way of calculating the day of the week of a given date

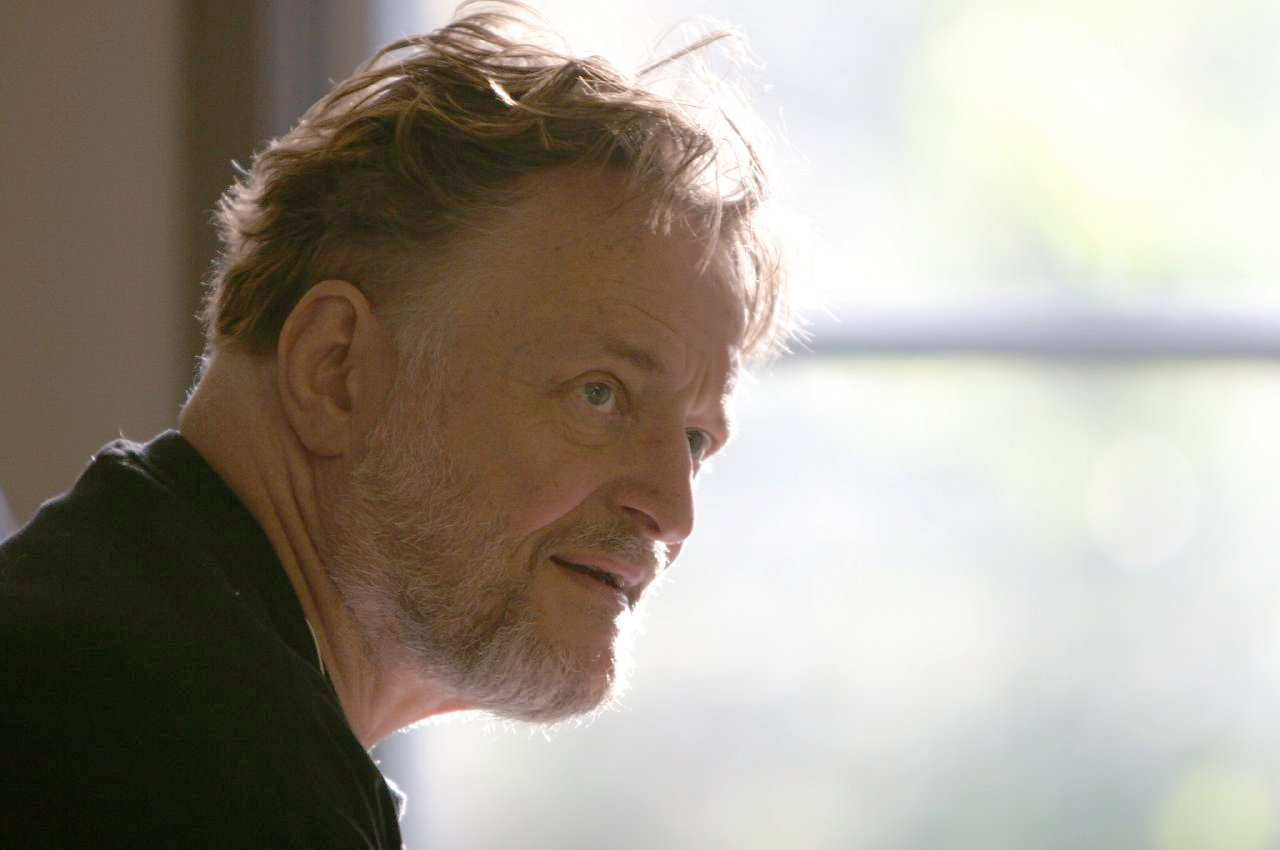
John Conway, inventor of the Doomsday algorithm

The Doomsday rule, Doomsday algorithm or Doomsday method is an algorithm of determination of the day of the week for a given date. It provides a perpetual calendar because the Gregorian calendar moves in cycles of 400 years. The algorithm for mental calculation was devised by John Conway in 1973, drawing inspiration from Lewis Carroll's perpetual calendar algorithm. It takes advantage of each year having a certain day of the week upon which certain easy-to-remember dates, called the doomsdays, fall; for example, the last day of February, April 4 (4/4), June 6 (6/6), August 8 (8/8), October 10 (10/10), and December 12 (12/12) all occur on the same day of the week in the year.

Applying the Doomsday algorithm involves three steps: determination of the anchor day for the century, calculation of the anchor day for the year from the one for the century, and selection of the closest date out of those that always fall on the doomsday, e.g., 4/4 and 6/6, and count of the number of days (modulo 7) between that date and the date in question to arrive at the day of the week. The technique applies to both the Gregorian calendar and the Julian calendar, although their doomsdays are usually different days of the week.

The algorithm is simple enough that it can be computed mentally. Conway could usually give the correct answer in under two seconds. To improve his speed, he practiced his calendrical calculations on his computer, which was programmed to quiz him with random dates every time he logged on.

== Doomsdays for contemporary years ==
Doomsday for the current year in the Gregorian calendar (2026) is Saturday. Simple methods for finding the doomsday of a year exist.

Anchor days for years from 1796 through 2105
Sun	Mon	Tue	Wed	Thu	Fri	Sat
	1796	1797	1798	1799	1800	1801
1802	1803		1804	1805	1806	1807
	1808	1809	1810	1811		1812
1813	1814	1815		1816	1817	1818
1819		1820	1821	1822	1823	
1824	1825	1826	1827		1828	1829
1830	1831		1832	1833	1834	1835
	1836	1837	1838	1839		1840
1841	1842	1843		1844	1845	1846
1847		1848	1849	1850	1851	
1852	1853	1854	1855		1856	1857
1858	1859		1860	1861	1862	1863
	1864	1865	1866	1867		1868
1869	1870	1871		1872	1873	1874
1875		1876	1877	1878	1879	
1880	1881	1882	1883		1884	1885
1886	1887		1888	1889	1890	1891
	1892	1893	1894	1895		1896
1897	1898	1899	1900	1901	1902	1903
	1904	1905	1906	1907		1908
1909	1910	1911		1912	1913	1914
1915		1916	1917	1918	1919	
1920	1921	1922	1923		1924	1925
1926	1927		1928	1929	1930	1931
	1932	1933	1934	1935		1936
1937	1938	1939		1940	1941	1942
1943		1944	1945	1946	1947	
1948	1949	1950	1951		1952	1953
1954	1955		1956	1957	1958	1959
	1960	1961	1962	1963		1964
1965	1966	1967		1968	1969	1970
1971		1972	1973	1974	1975	
1976	1977	1978	1979		1980	1981
1982	1983		1984	1985	1986	1987
	1988	1989	1990	1991		1992
1993	1994	1995		1996	1997	1998
1999		2000	2001	2002	2003	
2004	2005	2006	2007		2008	2009
2010	2011		2012	2013	2014	2015
	2016	2017	2018	2019		2020
2021	2022	2023		2024	2025	2026
2027		2028	2029	2030	2031	
2032	2033	2034	2035		2036	2037
2038	2039		2040	2041	2042	2043
	2044	2045	2046	2047		2048
2049	2050	2051		2052	2053	2054
2055		2056	2057	2058	2059	
2060	2061	2062	2063		2064	2065
2066	2067		2068	2069	2070	2071
	2072	2073	2074	2075		2076
2077	2078	2079		2080	2081	2082
2083		2084	2085	2086	2087	
2088	2089	2090	2091		2092	2093
2094	2095		2096	2097	2098	2099
2100	2101	2102	2103		2104	2105

== Finding the day of the week from a year's doomsday ==
One can find the day of the week of a given calendar date by using a nearby doomsday as a reference point. To help with this, the following is a list of easy-to-remember dates for each month that always land on the doomsday.

The last day of February is always a doomsday. For January, January 3 is a doomsday during common years and January 4 a doomsday during leap years, which can be remembered as "the 3rd during 3 years in 4, and the 4th in the 4th year". For March, one can remember either Pi Day or "March 0", the latter referring to the day before March 1, i.e. the last day of February.

For the months April through December, the even numbered months are covered by the double dates 4/4, 6/6, 8/8, 10/10, and 12/12, all of which fall on the doomsday. The odd numbered months can be remembered with the mnemonic "I work from 9 to 5 at the 7–11", i.e., 9/5, 7/11, and also 5/9 and 11/7, are all doomsdays (this is true for both the day/month and month/day conventions).

John Conway wrote that: "Summary: 'Last' in Jan and Feb, otherwise nth in even months, (n ± 4) in odd ones". He clarified that: "The sign is + for long odd months (31 days), and − for short ones (30 days)".

Several well-known dates, such as Independence Day in United States, Boxing Day, Halloween and Valentine's Day in common years, also fall on doomsdays every year.

Month	Memorable date	Month/day	Day/month	Mnemonic	Complete list of days
January	January 3 (common years), January 4 (leap years)	1/3 OR 1/4 (1/31 OR 1/32)	3/1 OR 4/1 (31/1 OR 32/1)	the 3rd 3 years in 4 and the 4th in the 4th (or: last day of January, pretending leap years have a January 32)	3, 10, 17, 24, 31 OR 4, 11, 18, 25
February	February 28 (common years), February 29 (leap years)	2/0 OR 2/1 (2/28 OR 2/29)	0/2 OR 1/2 (28/2 OR 29/2)	last day of January, pretending leap years have a January 32 (or: last day of February)	0, 7, 14, 21, 28 OR 1, 8, 15, 22, 29
March	"March 0," March 14	3/0 AND 3/14	0/3 AND 14/3	last day of February, Pi Day	0, 7, 14, 21, 28
April	April 4	4/4		4/4, 6/6, 8/8, 10/10, 12/12	4, 11, 18, 25
May	May 9	5/9	9/5	9-to-5 at 7-11	2, 9, 16, 23, 30
June	June 6	6/6		4/4, 6/6, 8/8, 10/10, 12/12	6, 13, 20, 27
July	July 11	7/11	11/7	9-to-5 at 7-11	4, 11, 18, 25
August	August 8	8/8		4/4, 6/6, 8/8, 10/10, 12/12	1, 8, 15, 22, 29
September	September 5	9/5	5/9	9-to-5 at 7-11	5, 12, 19, 26
October	October 10	10/10		4/4, 6/6, 8/8, 10/10, 12/12	3, 10, 17, 24, 31
November	November 7	11/7	7/11	9-to-5 at 7-11	0, 7, 14, 21, 28
December	December 12	12/12		4/4, 6/6, 8/8, 10/10, 12/12	5, 12, 19, 26

Since the doomsday for a particular year is directly related to weekdays of dates in the period from March through February of the next year, common years and leap years have to be distinguished for January and February of the same year.

=== Example ===
To find which day of the week Christmas Day of 2027 is, proceed as follows: in the year 2027, doomsday is on Sunday. Since December 12 is a doomsday, December 25, being thirteen days afterwards (two weeks less a day), will fall on a Saturday. Christmas Day is always the day of the week before doomsday. In addition, July 4 (U.S. Independence Day) is always on the same day of the week as a doomsday, as are Halloween (October 31), Pi Day (March 14), and December 26 (Boxing Day).

== Mnemonic weekday names ==
Since this algorithm involves treating days of the week like numbers modulo 7, John Conway suggested thinking of the days of the week as "Noneday" or "Sansday" (for Sunday), "Oneday", "Twosday", "Treblesday", "Foursday", "Fiveday", and "Six-a-day" to recall the number-weekday relation without needing to count them out in one's head.

Day of week	Index number	Mnemonic
Sunday	0	Noneday or Sansday
Monday	1	Oneday
Tuesday	2	Twosday
Wednesday	3	Treblesday
Thursday	4	Foursday
Friday	5	Fiveday
Saturday	6	Six-a-day

There are some languages, such as Slavic languages, Chinese, Estonian, Greek, Portuguese and Hebrew, that base some of the names of the week days in their positional order. The Slavic, Chinese, and Estonian agree with the table above; the other languages mentioned count from Sunday as day one.

== Finding a year's doomsday ==
First take the anchor day for the century. For the purposes of the doomsday rule, a century starts with '00 and ends with '99. The following table shows the anchor day of centuries 1600–1699, 1700–1799, 1800–1899, 1900–1999, 2000–2099, 2100–2199 and 2200–2299.

Century	Anchor day	Mnemonic	Index number	Weekday mnemonic
1600–1699	Tuesday	—	2	Twoday
1700–1799	Sunday	—	0	Noneday
1800–1899	Friday	—	5	Fiveday
1900–1999	Wednesday	We-in-dis-day (most living people were born in that century, see List of countries by median age)	3	Treblesday
2000–2099	Tuesday	Y-Tue-K or Twos-day (Y2K was at the head of this century)	2	Twosday
2100–2199	Sunday	Twenty-one-day is Sunday (2100 is the start of the next century)	0	Noneday
2200–2299	Friday	—	5	Fiveday

For the Gregorian calendar:

Mathematical formula
5 × (c mod 4) mod 7 + Tuesday = anchor.
Algorithmic
Let r = c mod 4
if r = 0 then anchor = Tuesday
if r = 1 then anchor = Sunday
if r = 2 then anchor = Friday
if r = 3 then anchor = Wednesday.

For the Julian calendar:

6c mod 7 + Sunday = anchor.

Note: $c = \biggl\lfloor {\text{year} \over 100} \biggr\rfloor$.

Next, find the year's anchor day. To accomplish that according to Conway:

1. Divide the year's last two digits (call this y) by 12 and let a be the floor of the quotient.
2. Let b be the remainder of the same quotient.
3. Divide that remainder by 4 and let c be the floor of the quotient.
4. Let d be the sum of the three numbers (d = a + b + c). (It is again possible here to divide by seven and take the remainder. This number is equivalent, as it must be, to y plus the floor of y divided by four.)
5. Count forward the specified number of days (d or the remainder of d/7) from the anchor day to get the year's one.

$$\begin{matrix}\left({\left\lfloor{\frac{y}{12}}\right\rfloor+y \bmod 12+\left\lfloor{\frac{y \bmod 12}{4}}\right\rfloor}\right) \bmod 7+\rm{anchor}=\rm{Doomsday}\end{matrix}$$

For the twentieth-century year 1966, for example:

$$\begin{matrix}\left({\left\lfloor{\frac{66}{12}}\right\rfloor+66 \bmod 12+\left\lfloor{\frac{66 \bmod 12}{4}}\right\rfloor}\right) \bmod 7+\rm{Wednesday} & = & \left(5+6+1\right) \bmod 7+\rm{Wednesday} \\
\ & = & \rm{Monday}\end{matrix}$$

As described in bullet 4, above, this is equivalent to:

$$\begin{matrix}\left({66 + \left\lfloor{\frac{66}{4}}\right\rfloor}\right) \bmod 7+\rm{Wednesday} & = & \left(66+16\right) \bmod 7+\rm{Wednesday} \\
\ & = & \rm{Monday}\end{matrix}$$

So doomsday in 1966 fell on Monday.

Similarly, doomsday in 2005 is on a Monday:

$$\left({\left\lfloor{\frac{5}{12}}\right\rfloor+5 \bmod 12+\left\lfloor{\frac{5 \bmod 12}{4}}\right\rfloor}\right) \bmod 7+\rm{Tuesday}=\rm{Monday}$$

=== Why it works ===
Doomsday rule

The doomsday's anchor day calculation is effectively calculating the number of days between any given date in the base year and the same date in the current year, then taking the remainder modulo 7. When both dates come after the leap day (if any), the difference is just 365y + y/4 (rounded down). But 365 equals 52 × 7 + 1, so after taking the remainder we get just

$$\left(y + \left\lfloor \frac{y}{4} \right\rfloor\right) \bmod 7.$$

This gives a simpler formula if one is comfortable dividing large values of y by both 4 and 7. For example, we can compute

$$\left(66 + \left\lfloor \frac{66}{4} \right\rfloor\right) \bmod 7 = (66 + 16) \bmod 7 = 82 \bmod 7 = 5$$

which gives the same answer as in the example above.

Where 12 comes in is that the pattern of $\bigl(y + \bigl\lfloor \tfrac{y}{4} \bigr\rfloor \bigr) \bmod 7$ almost repeats every 12 years. After 12 years, we get $\bigl(12 + \tfrac{12}{4}\bigr) \bmod 7 = 15 \bmod 7 = 1$. If we replace y by y mod 12, we are throwing this extra day away; but adding back in $\bigl\lfloor \tfrac{y}{12} \bigr\rfloor$ compensates for this error, giving the final formula.

For calculating the Gregorian anchor day of a century: three “common centuries” (each having 24 leap years) are followed by a “leap century” (having 25 leap years). A common century moves the doomsday forward by

$$(100 + 24) \bmod 7 = 2 + 3 = 5$$

days (equivalent to two days back). A leap century moves the doomsday forward by 6 days (equivalent to one day back).

So c centuries move the doomsday forward by

$$\left(5c + \biggl\lfloor {c \over 4} \biggr\rfloor \right) \bmod 7$$,

but this is equivalent to

$$(5 (c \bmod 4)) \bmod 7$$.

Four centuries move the doomsday forward by

$$-2 - 2 - 2 - 1 = -7, \qquad -7 \equiv 0 \quad \pmod{7}$$;

so four centuries form a cycle that leaves the doomsday unchanged (and hence the “mod 4” in the century formula).

=== The "odd + 11" method ===
A flowchart showing the Odd+11 method to calculate the anchor day

A simpler method for finding the year's anchor day was discovered in 2010 by Chamberlain Fong and Michael K. Walters. Called the "odd + 11" method, it is equivalent to computing

$$\left(y + \left\lfloor \frac{y}{4} \right\rfloor\right) \bmod 7$$.

It is well suited to mental calculation, because it requires no division by 4 (or 12), and the procedure is easy to remember because of its repeated use of the "odd + 11" rule. Furthermore, addition by 11 is very easy to perform mentally in base-10 arithmetic.

Extending this to get the anchor day, the procedure is often described as accumulating a running total T in six steps, as follows:

1. Let T be the year's last two digits.
2. If T is odd, add 11.
3. Now let T = T/2.
4. If T is odd, add 11.
5. Now let T = 7 − (T mod 7).
6. Count forward T days from the century's anchor day to get the year's anchor day.

Applying this method to the year 2005, for example, the steps as outlined would be:

1. T = 5
2. T = 5 + 11 = 16 (adding 11 because T is odd)
3. T = 16/2 = 8
4. T = 8 (do nothing since T is even)
5. T = 7 − (8 mod 7) = 7 − 1 = 6
6. Doomsday for 2005 = 6 + Tuesday = Monday The explicit formula for the odd+11 method is:

$$7- \left[\frac{y+11(y\,\bmod 2)}{2} + 11 \left(\frac{y+11(y\,\bmod 2)}{2}\bmod 2\right)\right] \bmod 7$$.

Although this expression looks daunting and complicated, it is actually simple because of a common subexpression (y + 11(y mod 2))/2 that only needs to be calculated once.

=== Nakai's formula ===
Another method for calculating the doomsday was proposed by H. Nakai in 2023.

As above, let the year number n be expressed as $n=100c+y$, where $c$ and $y$ represent the century and the last two digits of the year, respectively. If $c_2$ and $y_2$ denote the remainders when $c$ and $y$ are divided by 4, respectively, then the number representing the day of the week for the doomsday is given by the remainder $5(c_{2}+y_{2}-1)+10y \quad\text{mod}\; (7)$.

==== Example ====
(August 7, 1966) The remainder on dividing $(c,y)=(19,66)$ by 4 is $(c_2,y_2)=(3,2)$, which gives $5 \cdot (3+2-1)=20 \equiv 6$; 10 times $y$ is $10 \cdot 66 = 660 \equiv {2}$, so doomsday for 1966 is $6+2=8 \equiv 1$, that is, Monday. The difference between 7 and the doomsday in August (namely 8) is $7-8=-1 \equiv 6$, so the answer is $1+6 = 7 \equiv 0$, Sunday.

== Correspondence with dominical letter ==
Doomsday is related to the dominical letter of the year as follows.

Doomsday	Dominical letter	
Doomsday	Common year	Leap year
Sunday	C	DC
Monday	B	CB
Tuesday	A	BA
Wednesday	G	AG
Thursday	F	GF
Friday	E	FE
Saturday	D	ED

== 400-year cycle of anchor days ==
Julian centuries				-1600J −900J −200J 500J 1200J 1900J 2600J 3300J	-1500J −800J −100J 600J 1300J 2000J 2700J 3400J	-1400J −700J 0J 700J 1400J 2100J 2800J 3500J	-1300J −600J 100J 800J 1500J 2200J 2900J 3600J	-1200J −500J 200J 900J 1600J 2300J 3000J 3700J	-1100J −400J 300J 1000J 1700J 2400J 3100J 3800J	-1000J −300J 400J 1100J 1800J 2500J 3200J 3900J
Gregorian centuries Years				-1600 −1200 −800 −400 0 400 800 1200 1600 2000 2400 2800 3200 3600		-1500 −1100 −700 −300 100 500 900 1300 1700 2100 2500 2900 3300 3700		-1400 −1000 −600 −200 200 600 1000 1400 1800 2200 2600 3000 3400 3800		-1300 −900 −500 −100 300 700 1100 1500 1900 2300 2700 3100 3500 3900
00	28	56	84	Tue.	Mon.	Sun.	Sat.	Fri.	Thu.	Wed.
01	29	57	85	Wed.	Tue.	Mon.	Sun.	Sat.	Fri.	Thu.
02	30	58	86	Thu.	Wed.	Tue.	Mon.	Sun.	Sat.	Fri.
03	31	59	87	Fri.	Thu.	Wed.	Tue.	Mon.	Sun.	Sat.
04	32	60	88	Sun.	Sat.	Fri.	Thu.	Wed.	Tue.	Mon.
05	33	61	89	Mon.	Sun.	Sat.	Fri.	Thu.	Wed.	Tue.
06	34	62	90	Tue.	Mon.	Sun.	Sat.	Fri.	Thu.	Wed.
07	35	63	91	Wed.	Tue.	Mon.	Sun.	Sat.	Fri.	Thu.
08	36	64	92	Fri.	Thu.	Wed.	Tue.	Mon.	Sun.	Sat.
09	37	65	93	Sat.	Fri.	Thu.	Wed.	Tue.	Mon.	Sun.
10	38	66	94	Sun.	Sat.	Fri.	Thu.	Wed.	Tue.	Mon.
11	39	67	95	Mon.	Sun.	Sat.	Fri.	Thu.	Wed.	Tue.
12	40	68	96	Wed.	Tue.	Mon.	Sun.	Sat.	Fri.	Thu.
13	41	69	97	Thu.	Wed.	Tue.	Mon.	Sun.	Sat.	Fri.
14	42	70	98	Fri.	Thu.	Wed.	Tue.	Mon.	Sun.	Sat.
15	43	71	99	Sat.	Fri.	Thu.	Wed.	Tue.	Mon.	Sun.
16	44	72		Mon.	Sun.	Sat.	Fri.	Thu.	Wed.	Tue.
17	45	73		Tue.	Mon.	Sun.	Sat.	Fri.	Thu.	Wed.
18	46	74		Wed.	Tue.	Mon.	Sun.	Sat.	Fri.	Thu.
19	47	75		Thu.	Wed.	Tue.	Mon.	Sun.	Sat.	Fri.
20	48	76		Sat.	Fri.	Thu.	Wed.	Tue.	Mon.	Sun.
21	49	77		Sun.	Sat.	Fri.	Thu.	Wed.	Tue.	Mon.
22	50	78		Mon.	Sun.	Sat.	Fri.	Thu.	Wed.	Tue.
23	51	79		Tue.	Mon.	Sun.	Sat.	Fri.	Thu.	Wed.
24	52	80		Thu.	Wed.	Tue.	Mon.	Sun.	Sat.	Fri.
25	53	81		Fri.	Thu.	Wed.	Tue.	Mon.	Sun.	Sat.
26	54	82		Sat.	Fri.	Thu.	Wed.	Tue.	Mon.	Sun.
27	55	83		Sun.	Sat.	Fri.	Thu.	Wed.	Tue.	Mon.

Since in the Gregorian calendar there are 146,097 days, or exactly 20,871 seven-day weeks, in 400 years, the anchor day repeats every four centuries. For example, the anchor day of 1700–1799 is the same as the anchor day of 2100–2199, i.e. Sunday.

The full 400-year cycle of doomsdays is given in the adjacent table. The centuries are for the Gregorian and proleptic Gregorian calendar, unless marked with a J for Julian. The Gregorian leap years are highlighted.

Negative years use astronomical year numbering. Year 25BC is −24, shown in the column of −100J (proleptic Julian) or −100 (proleptic Gregorian), at the row 76.

Frequency of Gregorian doomsday in the 400-year cycle per weekday and year type
	Sunday	Monday	Tuesday	Wednesday	Thursday	Friday	Saturday	Total
Non-leap years	43	43	43	43	44	43	44	303
Leap years	13	15	13	15	13	14	14	97
Total	56	58	56	58	57	57	58	400

A leap year with Monday as doomsday means that Sunday is one of 97 days skipped in the 400-year sequence. Thus the total number of years with Sunday as doomsday is 71 minus the number of leap years with Monday as doomsday, etc. Since Monday as doomsday is skipped across February 29, 2000, and the pattern of leap days is symmetric about that leap day, the frequencies of doomsdays per weekday (adding common and leap years) are symmetric about Monday. The frequencies of doomsdays of leap years per weekday are symmetric about the doomsday of 2000, Tuesday.

The frequency of a particular date being on a particular weekday can easily be derived from the above (for a date from January 1 – February 28, relate it to the doomsday of the previous year).

For example, February 28 is one day after doomsday of the previous year, so it is 58 times each on Tuesday, Thursday and Sunday, etc. February 29 is doomsday of a leap year, so it is 15 times each on Monday and Wednesday, etc.

=== 28-year cycle ===
Regarding the frequency of doomsdays in a Julian 28-year cycle, there are 1 leap year and 3 common years for every weekday, the latter 6, 17 and 23 years after the former (so with intervals of 6, 11, 6, and 5 years; not evenly distributed because after 12 years the day is skipped in the sequence of doomsdays). The same cycle applies for any given date from March 1 falling on a particular weekday.

For any given date up to February 28 falling on a particular weekday, the 3 common years are 5, 11, and 22 years after the leap year, so with intervals of 5, 6, 11, and 6 years. Thus the cycle is the same, but with the 5-year interval after instead of before the leap year.

Thus, for any date except February 29, the intervals between common years falling on a particular weekday are 6, 11, 11. See e.g. at the bottom of the page Common year starting on Monday the years in the range 1906–2091.

For February 29 falling on a particular weekday, there is just one in every 28 years, and it is of course a leap year.

=== Julian calendar ===
The Gregorian calendar is currently accurately lining up with astronomical events such as solstices. In 1582 this modification of the Julian calendar was first instituted. To correct for calendar drift, 10 days were skipped, so doomsday moved back 10 days (i.e. 3 weekdays): Thursday, October 4 (Julian, doomsday is Wednesday) was followed by Friday, October 15 (Gregorian, doomsday is Sunday). The table includes Julian calendar years, but the algorithm is for the Gregorian and proleptic Gregorian calendar only.

Note that the Gregorian calendar was not adopted simultaneously in all countries, so for many centuries, different regions used different dates for the same day.

== Full examples ==
=== Example 1 (1985) ===
Suppose we want to know the day of the week of September 18, 1985. We begin with the century's anchor day, Wednesday. To this, add a, b, and c above:

- a is the floor of 85/12, which is 7.
- b is 85 mod 12, which is 1.
- c is the floor of b/4, which is 0.

This yields a + b + c = 8. Counting 8 days from Wednesday, we reach Thursday, which is the doomsday in 1985. (Using numbers: In modulo 7 arithmetic, 8 is congruent to 1. Because the century's anchor day is Wednesday (index 3), and 3 + 1 = 4, doomsday in 1985 was Thursday (index 4).) We now compare September 18 to a nearby doomsday, September 5. We see that the 18th is 13 past a doomsday, i.e. one day less than two weeks. Hence, the 18th was a Wednesday (the day preceding Thursday). (Using numbers: In modulo 7 arithmetic, 13 is congruent to 6 or, more succinctly, −1. Thus, we take one away from the doomsday, Thursday, to find that September 18, 1985, was a Wednesday.)

=== Example 2 (other centuries) ===
Suppose that one wants to find the day of week that the American Civil War broke out at Fort Sumter, which was April 12, 1861. The anchor day for the century was 94 days after Tuesday, or, in other words, Friday (calculated as 18 × 5 + ⌊18/4⌋). The digits 61 gave a displacement of six days so doomsday was Thursday. Therefore, April 4 was Thursday so April 12, eight days later, was a Friday.

== See also ==
- Ordinal date
- Computus – Gauss algorithm for Easter date calculation
- Zeller's congruence – An algorithm (1882) to calculate the day of the week for any Julian or Gregorian calendar date.
- Mental calculation
