= Robert Arnott Wilson =

Mathematician (born 1958)

- Education: University of Cambridge
- Known for: Monster group; Suzuki groups
- Scientific career
- Fields: Mathematics
- Workplaces: Queen Mary, University of London
- Thesis: Maximal Subgroups of Some Finite Simple Groups (1983)
- Doctoral advisor: John Horton Conway
- Website: www.maths.qmul.ac.uk/~raw/

Robert Arnott Wilson (born 1958) is a retired mathematician in London, England, who is best known for his work on classifying the maximal subgroups of finite simple groups and for the work in the Monster group. He is also an accomplished violin, viola and piano player, having played as the principal viola in the Sinfonia of Birmingham. Due to a damaged finger, he now principally plays the kora.

== Books ==
- Conway, John Horton; Curtis, Robert Turner; Norton, Simon Phillips; Parker, Richard A; Wilson, Robert Arnott (1985). Atlas of finite groups: maximal subgroups and ordinary characters for simple groups. Oxford University Press. ISBN 978-0-19-853199-9.
- An Atlas of Brauer Characters (London Mathematical Society Monographs) by Christopher Jansen, Klaus Lux, Richard Parker, Robert Wilson. Oxford University Press, USA (1 October 1995) ISBN 0-19-851481-6
- Wilson, Robert A. (2009). The finite simple groups. Graduate Texts in Mathematics. Vol. 251. Berlin, New York: Springer-Verlag. doi:10.1007/978-1-84800-988-2. ISBN 978-1-84800-987-5. Zbl 1203.20012.

=== as editor ===
- Curtis, R.; Wilson, R.A., eds. (1998). The Atlas of Finite Groups: Ten Years On. London Mathematical Society Lectures Note Series, No. 249. Cambridge University Press. ISBN 978-0-521-57587-4.
