= Mathieu groupoid =

Groupoid related to the Mathieu group M12

In mathematics, the Mathieu groupoid M_{13} is a groupoid acting on 13 points such that the stabilizer of each point is the Mathieu group M_{12}. It was introduced by Conway (1987, 1997) and studied in detail by Conway, Elkies & Martin (2006).

== Construction ==
The projective plane of order 3 has 13 points and 13 lines, each containing 4 points. The Mathieu groupoid can be visualized as a sliding block puzzle by placing 12 counters on 12 of the 13 points of the projective plane. A move consists of moving a counter from any point x to the empty point y, then exchanging the 2 other counters on the line containing x and y. The Mathieu groupoid consists of the permutations that can be obtained by composing several moves.

This is not a group because two operations A and B can only be composed if the empty point after carrying out A is the empty point at the beginning of B. It is in fact a groupoid (a category such that every morphism is invertible) whose 13 objects are the 13 points, and whose morphisms from x to y are the operations taking the empty point from x to y. The morphisms fixing the empty point form a group isomorphic to the Mathieu group M_{12} with 12×11×10×9×8 elements.
