= Neil Sloane =

British-American mathematician (born 1939)

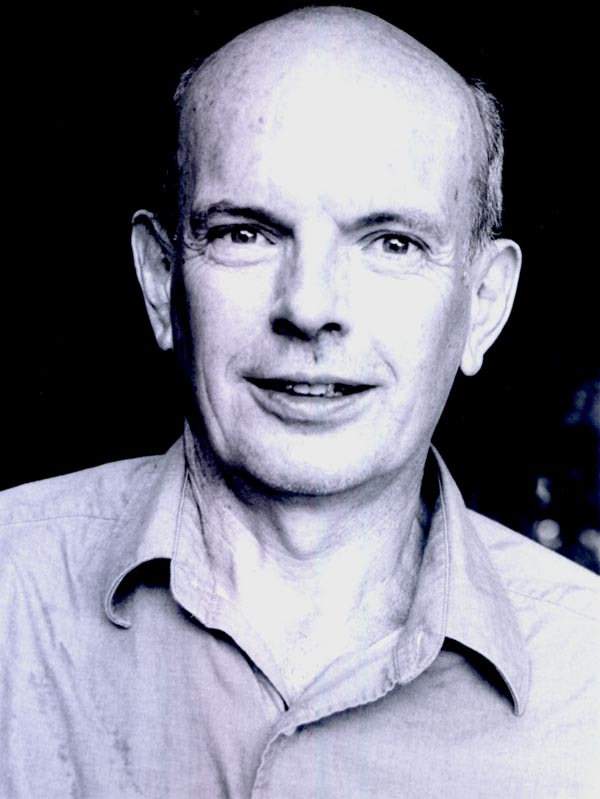
- Neil Sloane in 1997
- Born: October 10, 1939 (age 87); Beaumaris, Wales
- Education: University of Melbourne; Cornell University
- Known for: Sphere Packings, Lattices and Groups (with J. H. Conway), The Theory of Error-Correcting Codes (with F. J. MacWilliams), and the On-Line Encyclopedia of Integer Sequences
- Awards: Chauvenet Prize (1979); Claude E. Shannon Award (1998); IEEE Richard W. Hamming Medal (2005)
- Scientific career
- Workplaces: Cornell University; AT&T Bell Laboratories; AT&T Labs
- Doctoral advisor: Frederick Jelinek, Wolfgang Fuchs
- Website: neilsloane.com

Neil James Alexander Sloane FLSW (born October 10, 1939) is a British-American mathematician. His major contributions are in the fields of combinatorics, error-correcting codes, and sphere packing. Sloane is best known for being the creator and maintainer of the On-Line Encyclopedia of Integer Sequences (OEIS).

== Biography ==
Sloane was born in Beaumaris, Anglesey, Wales, in 1939, moving to Cowes, Isle of Wight, England in 1946. The family emigrated to Australia, arriving at the start of 1949. Sloane then moved from Melbourne to the United States in 1961.

He studied at Cornell University under Nick DeClaris, Frank Rosenblatt, Frederick Jelinek and Wolfgang Heinrich Johannes Fuchs, receiving his Ph.D. in 1967. His doctoral dissertation was titled Lengths of Cycle Times in Random Neural Networks. Sloane joined Bell Labs in 1968 and retired from its successor AT&T Labs in 2012. He became an AT&T fellow in 1998. He is also a fellow of the Learned Society of Wales, an IEEE fellow, a fellow of the American Mathematical Society, and a member of the National Academy of Engineering.

He is a winner of a Lester R. Ford Award in 1978 and the Chauvenet Prize in 1979. In 1998 he was an Invited Speaker of the International Congress of Mathematicians in Berlin. In 2005 Sloane received the IEEE Richard W. Hamming Medal. In 2008 he received the Mathematical Association of America David P. Robbins Prize, and in 2013 the George Pólya Award.

In 2014, to celebrate his 75th birthday, Sloane shared some of his favorite integer sequences. Besides mathematics, he loves rock climbing and has authored two rock-climbing guides to New Jersey.

He regularly appears in videos for Brady Haran's YouTube channel Numberphile.

== Selected publications ==
- Neil James Alexander Sloane, A Handbook of Integer Sequences, Academic Press, NY, 1973.
- Florence Jessie MacWilliams and Neil James Alexander Sloane, The Theory of Error-Correcting Codes, Elsevier/North-Holland, Amsterdam, 1977.
- M. Harwit and Neil James Alexander Sloane, Hadamard Transform Optics, Academic Press, San Diego CA, 1979.
- Neil James Alexander Sloane and A. D. Wyner, editors, Claude Elwood Shannon: Collected Papers, IEEE Press, NY, 1993.
- Neil James Alexander Sloane and S. Plouffe, The Encyclopedia of Integer Sequences, Academic Press, San Diego, 1995.
- J. H. Conway and Neil James Alexander Sloane, Sphere Packings, Lattices and Groups, Springer-Verlag, NY, 1st edn., 1988; 2nd edn., 1993; 3rd ed., 1998.
- A. S. Hedayat, Neil James Alexander Sloane and J. Stufken, Orthogonal Arrays: Theory and Applications, Springer-Verlag, NY, 1999.
- G. Nebe, E. M. Rains and Neil James Alexander Sloane, Self-Dual Codes and Invariant Theory, Springer-Verlag, 2006.

== See also ==
- Reeds–Sloane algorithm
- Sloane's gap
