= Gabriele Nebe =

German mathematician

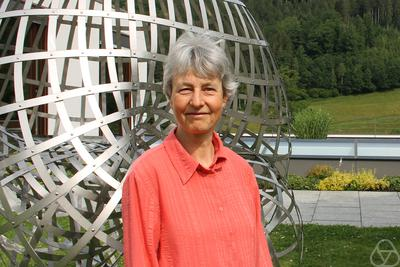
- Nebe at Oberwolfach, 2025
- Born: 1967
- Education: RWTH Aachen University
- Known for: Online Catalogue of Lattices
- Scientific career
- Workplaces: RWTH Aachen University; Ulm University
- Thesis: Endliche Rationale Matrixgruppen vom Grad 24 (1995)
- Doctoral advisor: Wilhelm Plesken
- Website: www.math.rwth-aachen.de/~Gabriele.Nebe/

Gabriele Nebe (born 1967) is a German mathematician with contributions in the theory of lattices, modular forms, spherical designs, and error-correcting codes. With Neil Sloane, she maintains the Online Catalogue of Lattices. She is a professor in the department of mathematics at RWTH Aachen University.

== Education ==
Nebe earned a doctorate (Dr. rer. nat.) in 1995 from RWTH Aachen University. Her dissertation, Endliche Rationale Matrixgruppen vom Grad 24 concerned the theory of finite matrix groups and was supervised by Wilhelm Plesken.

== Research ==
Nebe is known for using integral representations of finite groups to construct explicit examples of discrete mathematical structures using computer algebra systems. Her constructions include extremal even unimodular lattices in 48, 56, and 72 dimensions and an extremal 3-modular lattice in 64 dimensions. These lattices represent the densest known sphere packings and the highest known kissing numbers in these dimensions. Her discovery of an extremal unimodular lattice in 72 dimensions settled a long open problem.

Recent research publications include:

== Awards and honours ==
- 1995 – Friedrich Wilhelm Prize
- 2002 – Merckle Research Prize
- 2003-2004 – Research Fellowship – Radcliffe Institute, Harvard University
