= John Horton Conway =

English mathematician (1937–2020)

John Horton Conway FRS
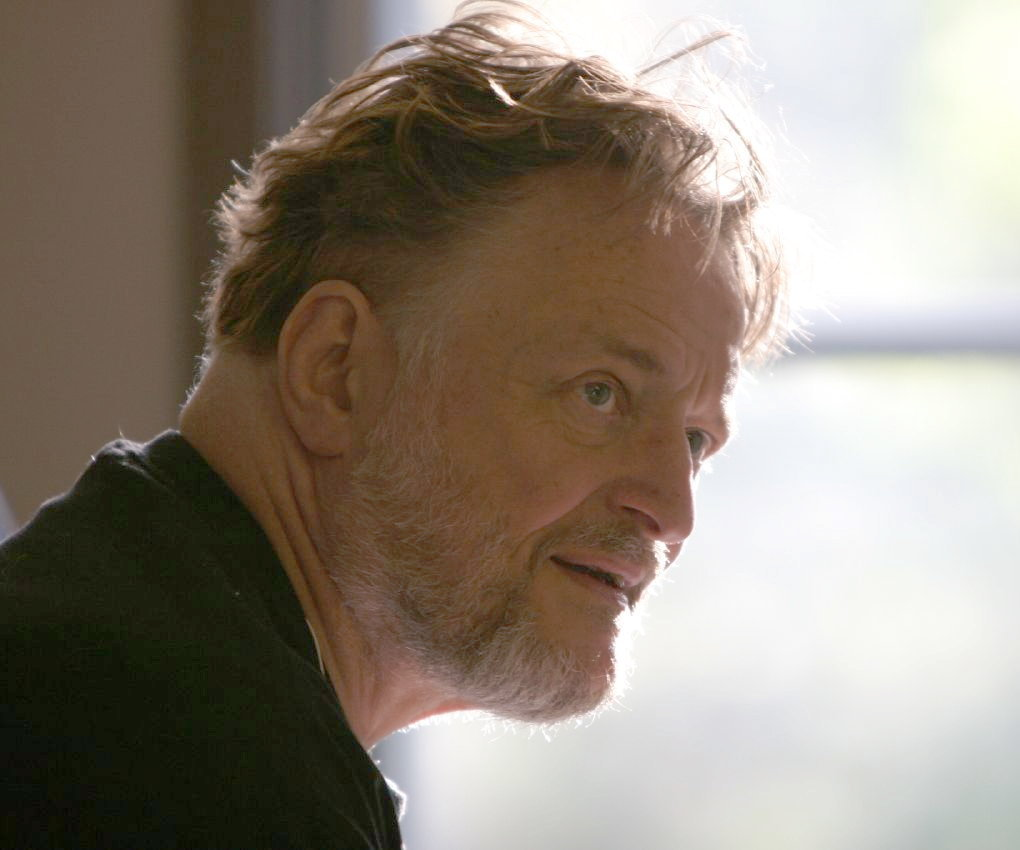
- Conway in June 2005
- Born: 26 December 1937; Liverpool, Lancashire, England
- Died: 11 April 2020 (aged 82); New Brunswick, New Jersey, U.S.
- Education: Gonville and Caius College, Cambridge (BA, MA, PhD)
- Known for: ATLAS of Finite Groups; Conway chained arrow notation; Conway criterion; Conway groups; Conway notation (knot theory); Conway's knot polynomial; Conway polyhedron notation; Conway's Game of Life; Doomsday algorithm; FRACTRAN; Free will theorem; Icosians; Look-and-say sequence; Mathieu groupoid; Monstrous moonshine; Pinwheel tiling; Surreal numbers; in his work on combinatorial game theory
- Awards: Berwick Prize (1971); Fellow of the Royal Society (1981); Pólya Prize (1987); Nemmers Prize in Mathematics (1998); Leroy P. Steele Prize (2000)
- Scientific career
- Fields: Mathematics
- Workplaces: University of Cambridge; Princeton University
- Thesis: Homogeneous ordered sets (1964)
- Doctoral advisor: Harold Davenport
- Doctoral students: Richard Borcherds; Adrian Mathias; Simon Norton; Robert Wilson
- Website: Archived version @ web.archive.org

John Horton Conway (26 December 1937 – 11 April 2020) was an English mathematician. He was active in the theory of finite groups, knot theory, number theory, combinatorial game theory and coding theory. He also made contributions to many branches of recreational mathematics, most notably the invention of the cellular automaton called the Game of Life.

Born and raised in Liverpool, Conway spent the first half of his career at the University of Cambridge before moving to the United States, where he held the John von Neumann Professorship at Princeton University for the rest of his career. On 11 April 2020, at age 82, he died of complications from COVID-19.

== Early life and education ==
Conway was born on 26 December 1937 in Liverpool, the son of Cyril Horton Conway and Agnes Boyce. He became interested in mathematics at a very early age. By the time he was 11, his ambition was to become a mathematician. After leaving sixth form, he studied mathematics at Gonville and Caius College, Cambridge. A "terribly introverted adolescent" in school, he took his admission to Cambridge as an opportunity to transform himself into an extrovert, a change which would later earn him the nickname of "the world's most charismatic mathematician".

Conway was awarded a BA in 1959 and, supervised by Harold Davenport, began to undertake research in number theory. Having solved the open problem posed by Davenport on writing numbers as the sums of fifth powers, Conway became interested in infinite ordinals. It appears that his interest in games began during his years studying the Cambridge Mathematical Tripos, where he became an avid backgammon player, spending hours playing the game in the common room.

In 1964, Conway was awarded his doctorate and was appointed as College Fellow and Lecturer in Mathematics at Sidney Sussex College, Cambridge.

After leaving Cambridge in 1986, he took up the appointment to the John von Neumann Chair of Mathematics at Princeton University. There, he won the Princeton University Pi Day pie-eating contest.

== Conway and Martin Gardner ==
Conway's career was intertwined with that of Martin Gardner. When Gardner featured Conway's Game of Life in his Mathematical Games column in October 1970, it became the most widely read of all his columns and made Conway an instant celebrity. Gardner and Conway had first corresponded in the late 1950s, and over the years Gardner had frequently written about recreational aspects of Conway's work. For instance, he discussed Conway's game of Sprouts (July 1967), Hackenbush (January 1972), and his angel and devil problem (February 1974). In the September 1976 column, he reviewed Conway's book On Numbers and Games and even managed to explain Conway's surreal numbers.

Conway was a prominent member of Martin Gardner's Mathematical Grapevine. He regularly visited Gardner and often wrote him long letters summarizing his recreational research. In a 1976 visit, Gardner kept him for a week, pumping him for information on the Penrose tilings which had just been announced. Conway had discovered many (if not most) of the major properties of the tilings. Gardner used these results when he introduced the world to Penrose tiles in his January 1977 column. The cover of that issue of Scientific American features the Penrose tiles and is based on a sketch by Conway.

== Major areas of research ==
=== Recreational mathematics ===
A single Gosper's Glider Gun creating "gliders" in Conway's Game of Life

Conway invented the Game of Life, one of the early examples of a cellular automaton. His initial experiments in that field were done with pen and paper, long before personal computers existed. Since Conway's game was popularized by Martin Gardner in Scientific American in 1970, it has spawned hundreds of computer programs, web sites, and articles. It is a staple of recreational mathematics. The LifeWiki is devoted to curating and cataloging the various aspects of the game. From the earliest days, it has been a favorite in computer labs, both for its theoretical interest and as a practical exercise in programming and data display. Conway came to dislike how discussions of him heavily focused on his Game of Life, feeling that it overshadowed deeper and more important things he had done, although he remained proud of his work on it. The game helped to launch a new branch of mathematics, the field of cellular automata. The Game of Life is known to be Turing complete.

=== Combinatorial game theory ===
Conway contributed to combinatorial game theory (CGT), a theory of partisan games. He developed the theory with Elwyn Berlekamp and Richard Guy, and also co-authored the book Winning Ways for your Mathematical Plays with them. He also wrote On Numbers and Games (ONAG) which lays out the mathematical foundations of CGT.

He was also one of the inventors of the game sprouts, as well as philosopher's football. He developed detailed analyses of many other games and puzzles, such as the Soma cube, peg solitaire, and Conway's soldiers. He came up with the angel problem, which was solved in 2006.

He invented a new system of numbers, the surreal numbers, which are closely related to certain games and have been the subject of a mathematical novelette by Donald Knuth. He also invented a nomenclature for exceedingly large numbers, the Conway chained arrow notation. Much of this is discussed in the 0th part of ONAG.

=== Geometry ===
In the mid-1960s with Michael Guy, Conway established that there are sixty-four convex uniform polychora excluding two infinite sets of prismatic forms. They discovered the grand antiprism in the process, the only non-Wythoffian uniform polychoron. Conway also suggested a system of notation dedicated to describing polyhedra called Conway polyhedron notation.

In the theory of tessellations, he devised the Conway criterion which is a fast way to identify many prototiles that tile the plane.

He investigated lattices in higher dimensions and was the first to determine the symmetry group of the Leech lattice.

Together with Neil Sloane, he invented the icosians.

=== Geometric topology ===
In knot theory, Conway formulated a new variation of the Alexander polynomial and produced a new invariant now called the Conway polynomial. After lying dormant for more than a decade, this concept became central to work in the 1980s on the novel knot polynomials. Conway further developed tangle theory and invented a system of notation for tabulating knots, now known as Conway notation, while correcting a number of errors in the 19th-century knot tables and extending them to include all but four of the non-alternating primes with 11 crossings. The Conway knot is named after him.

Conway's conjecture that, in any thrackle, the number of edges is at most equal to the number of vertices, is still open.

=== Group theory ===
Conway was the primary author of the ATLAS of Finite Groups giving properties of many finite simple groups. Working with his colleagues Robert Curtis and Simon P. Norton he constructed the first concrete representations of some of the sporadic groups. More specifically, he discovered three sporadic groups based on the symmetry of the Leech lattice, which have been designated the Conway groups. This work made him a key player in the successful classification of the finite simple groups.

Based on a 1978 observation by mathematician John McKay, Conway and Norton formulated the complex of conjectures known as monstrous moonshine. This subject, named by Conway, relates the monster group with elliptic modular functions, thus bridging two previously distinct areas of mathematics—finite groups and complex function theory. Monstrous moonshine theory has now been revealed to also have deep connections to string theory.

Conway introduced the Mathieu groupoid, an extension of the Mathieu group M_{12} to 13 points.

=== Number theory ===
As a graduate student, he proved one case of a conjecture by Edward Waring, that every integer could be written as the sum of 37 numbers each raised to the fifth power, though Chen Jingrun solved the problem independently before Conway's work could be published. In 1972, Conway proved that a natural generalization of the Collatz problem is algorithmically undecidable. Related to that, he developed the esoteric programming language FRACTRAN. While lecturing on the Collatz conjecture, Terence Tao (who was taught by him in graduate school) mentioned Conway's result and said that he was "always very good at making extremely weird connections in mathematics".

=== Algebra ===
Conway published original work on algebraic structures, focusing particularly on quaternions and octonions.

=== Analysis ===
He invented his base 13 function as a counterexample to the converse of the intermediate value theorem: the function takes on every real value in each interval on the real line, so it has a Darboux property but is not continuous.

=== Algorithms ===
For calculating the day of the week, he invented the Doomsday algorithm. The algorithm is simple enough for anyone with basic arithmetic ability to do the calculations mentally. Conway could usually give the correct answer in under two seconds. To improve his speed, he practised his calendrical calculations on his computer, which was programmed to quiz him with random dates every time he logged on. One of his early textbooks was Stephen Kleene's theory of finite-state machines.

=== Theoretical physics ===
In 2004, Conway and Simon B. Kochen, another Princeton mathematician, proved the free will theorem, a version of the "no hidden variables" principle of quantum mechanics. It states that given certain conditions, if an experimenter can freely decide what quantities to measure in a particular experiment, then elementary particles must be free to choose their spins to make the measurements consistent with physical law. Conway said that "if experimenters have free will, then so do elementary particles."

== Personal life and death ==
Conway was married three times. With his first two wives he had two sons and four daughters. He married Diana in 2001 and had another son with her. He had three grandchildren and two great-grandchildren.

On 8 April 2020, Conway developed symptoms of COVID-19. On 11 April, he died in New Brunswick, New Jersey, United States, at the age of 82.

== Awards and honours ==
Conway received the Berwick Prize (1971), was elected a fellow of the Royal Society (1981), became a fellow of the American Academy of Arts and Sciences in 1992, was the first recipient of the Pólya Prize (LMS) (1987), won the Nemmers Prize in Mathematics (1998) and received the Leroy P. Steele Prize for Mathematical Exposition (2000) of the American Mathematical Society. In 2001 he was awarded an honorary degree from the University of Liverpool, and in 2014 one from Alexandru Ioan Cuza University.

His Fellow of the Royal Society nomination in 1981 reads:

A versatile mathematician who combines a deep combinatorial insight with algebraic virtuosity, particularly in the construction and manipulation of "off-beat" algebraic structures which illuminate a wide variety of problems in completely unexpected ways. He has made distinguished contributions to the theory of finite groups, to the theory of knots, to mathematical logic (both set theory and automata theory) and to the theory of games (as also to its practice).

In 2017 Conway was given honorary membership of the British Mathematical Association.

Conferences called Gathering 4 Gardner are held every two years to celebrate the legacy of Martin Gardner, and Conway himself was often a featured speaker at these events, discussing various aspects of recreational mathematics.

== Select publications ==
- 1971 – Regular algebra and finite machines. Chapman and Hall, London, 1971, Series: Chapman and Hall mathematics series, ISBN 0412106205.
- 1976 – On numbers and games. Academic Press, New York, 1976, Series: L.M.S. monographs, 6, ISBN 0121863506.
- 1979 – On the Distribution of Values of Angles Determined by Coplanar Points (with Paul Erdős, Michael Guy, and H. T. Croft). Journal of the London Mathematical Society, vol. II, series 19, pp. 137–143.
- 1979 – Monstrous Moonshine (with Simon P. Norton). Bulletin of the London Mathematical Society, vol. 11, issue 2, pp. 308–339.
- 1982 – Winning Ways for your Mathematical Plays (with Richard K. Guy and Elwyn Berlekamp). Academic Press, ISBN 0120911507.
- 1985 – Atlas of finite groups (with Robert Turner Curtis, Simon Phillips Norton, Richard A. Parker, and Robert Arnott Wilson). Clarendon Press, New York, Oxford University Press, 1985, ISBN 0198531990.
- 1988 – Sphere Packings, Lattices and Groups (with Neil Sloane). Springer-Verlag, New York, Series: Grundlehren der mathematischen Wissenschaften, 290, ISBN 9780387966175.
- 1995 – Minimal-Energy Clusters of Hard Spheres (with Neil Sloane, R. H. Hardin, and Tom Duff). Discrete & Computational Geometry, vol. 14, no. 3, pp. 237–259.
- 1996 – The Book of Numbers (with Richard K. Guy). Copernicus, New York, 1996, ISBN 0614971667.
- 1997 – The Sensual (quadratic) Form (with Francis Yein Chei Fung). Mathematical Association of America, Washington, DC, 1997, Series: Carus mathematical monographs, no. 26, ISBN 1614440255.
- 2002 – On Quaternions and Octonions (with Derek A. Smith). A. K. Peters, Natick, MA, 2002, ISBN 1568811349.
- 2008 – The Symmetries of Things (with Heidi Burgiel and Chaim Goodman-Strauss). A. K. Peters, Wellesley, MA, 2008, ISBN 1568812205.

== See also ==
- List of things named after John Horton Conway

== Sources ==
- Alpert, Mark (1999). Not Just Fun and Games Scientific American, April 1999
- Boden, Margaret (2006). Mind As Machine, Oxford University Press, 2006, p. 1271
- du Sautoy, Marcus (2008). Symmetry, HarperCollins, p. 308
- Guy, Richard K (1983). Conway's Prime Producing Machine Mathematics Magazine, Vol. 56, No. 1 (Jan 1983), pp. 26–33
- Roberts, Siobhan (2015). Genius at play: The curious mind of John Horton Conway. Bloomsbury. ISBN 978-1620405932.
- O'Connor, John J.; Robertson, Edmund F., "John Horton Conway", MacTutor History of Mathematics Archive, University of St Andrews
- John Horton Conway at the Mathematics Genealogy Project
- Princeton University (2009). Bibliography of John H. Conway Mathematics Department
- Seife, Charles (1994). Impressions of Conway The Sciences
- Schleicher, Dierk (2011), Interview with John Conway, Notices of the AMS
