= Simon P. Norton =

British mathematician (1952–2019)

- Born: 28 February 1952
- Died: 13 February 2019 (aged 66)
- Education: University of Cambridge
- Scientific career
- Fields: Mathematics
- Thesis: F and Other Simple Groups (1976)
- Doctoral advisor: John Horton Conway

Simon Phillips Norton (28 February 1952 – 13 February 2019) was a mathematician in Cambridge, England, who worked on finite simple groups.

== Education ==
Simon Norton was born into a Sephardi family of Iraqi descent, the youngest of three brothers.

From 1964 he was a King's Scholar at Eton College, where he earned a reputation as an eccentric mathematical genius and was taught by Norman Routledge. He obtained an external first-class degree in Pure Mathematics at the University of London while still at the school, commuting to Royal Holloway College.

He also represented the United Kingdom at the International Mathematical Olympiad thrice consecutively starting from 1967, winning a gold medal each time and two special prizes in 1967 and 1969.

He then went up to Trinity College, Cambridge, and achieved a first in the final examinations.

== Career and life ==
He stayed at Cambridge, working on finite groups. Norton was one of the authors of the ATLAS of Finite Groups. He constructed the Harada–Norton group and in 1979, together with John Conway proved there is a connection between the Monster group and the j-function in number theory. They dubbed this "monstrous moonshine", and made some conjectures later proved by Richard Borcherds. Norton also made several early discoveries in Conway's Game of Life, and invented the game Snort.

In 1985, Cambridge University did not renew his contract.

Norton is the subject of the biography The Genius in My Basement, written by his Cambridge tenant, Alexander Masters, which describes his eccentric lifestyle and his life-long obsession with buses. He was also an occasional contributor to Word Ways: The Journal of Recreational Linguistics.

Norton was very interested in transport issues and was a member of Subterranea Britannica. He coordinated the local group of the Campaign for Better Transport (United Kingdom), and had done so since the organisation was known as Transport 2000, writing most of the newsletter for the local Cambridge group and tirelessly campaigning for efficient, inclusive and environmentally friendly public transport in the region and across the United Kingdom.

He collapsed and died in north London, aged 66, of a heart condition on 13 February 2019.

== Selected publications ==
- Cummins, C. J.; Norton, S. P. (1995). "Rational Hauptmoduls are replicable". Canadian Journal of Mathematics. 47 (6): 1201–1218. doi:10.4153/cjm-1995-061-1. S2CID 123645483.
- Norton, S. P. (1996). "Non-monstrous moonshine". In Arasu, K. T.; Dillon, J. F.; Harada, K.; Sehgal, S.; Solomon, R. (eds.). Groups, Difference Sets, and the Monster: Proceedings of a Special Research Quarter at The Ohio State University, Spring 1993. Walter de Gruyter. pp. 433–441. ISBN 9783110147919.
- Norton, S.P. (1996). "Free transposition groups". Communications in Algebra. 24 (2): 425–432. doi:10.1080/00927879608825578.
- Norton, S. P. (1998). "Anatomy of the Monster: I". In Curtis, Robert T.; Wilson, Robert A. (eds.). The Atlas of Finite Groups: Ten Years On. London Mathematical Society Lecture Note Series, 249. pp. 198–214. ISBN 9780521575874.
- Norton, Simon (2001). "Computing in the Monster". Journal of Symbolic Computation. 31 (1–2): 193–201. doi:10.1006/jsco.1999.1008.
- Norton, Simon P.; Wilson, Robert A. (2002). "Anatomy of the Monster: II". Proceedings of the London Mathematical Society. 84 (3): 581–598. doi:10.1112/S0024611502013357. S2CID 2279725.
