= Holocene calendar =

Calendar era that uses 10,000 BC as 1 HE

The Holocene calendar, also known as the Holocene Era or Human Era (HE), is a year numbering system that adds exactly 10,000 years to the currently dominant (AD/BC or CE/BCE) numbering scheme, placing its first year near the beginning of the Holocene geological epoch and the Neolithic Revolution, when humans shifted from a hunter-gatherer lifestyle to agriculture and fixed settlements. The current year by the Gregorian calendar, AD 2026, is 12026 HE in the Holocene calendar. The HE scheme was first proposed by Cesare Emiliani in 1993 (11993 HE), though similar proposals to start a new calendar at the same date had been put forward decades earlier. Emiliani thereby dismissed his original proposal to align the era with the 7980-year Julian cycles, i.e. start with the epoch in 4713 BCE (5288 HE).

== Overview ==
Cesare Emiliani's proposal for a calendar reform sought to solve a number of alleged problems with the current Anno Domini era, also called the Common Era, which numbers the years of the commonly accepted world calendar. These issues include:

- The Anno Domini era has no year "zero", with 1 BC followed immediately by AD 1, making calculation of time spans error-prone.
- The years BC/BCE are counted down when moving from past to future, further complicating the calculation of timespans.
- The birth date of Jesus is a less universally relevant epoch event than the approximate beginning of the Holocene.
- The Anno Domini era is based on the erroneous or contentious estimates of the birth year of Jesus of Nazareth. The era places Jesus's birth year in AD 1, but modern scholars have determined that it is more likely that he was born in or before 4 BC. Emiliani argued that replacing the contested date with the approximate beginning of the Holocene makes more sense.

Instead, HE uses the "beginning of human era" as its epoch, arbitrarily defined as 10,000 BC and denoted year 1 HE, so that AD 1 matches 10,001 HE. This is a rough approximation of the start of the current geologic epoch, the Holocene (the name means entirely recent). The motivation for this is that human civilization (e.g. the first settlements, agriculture, etc.) is believed to have arisen within this time. Emiliani later proposed that the start of the Holocene should be fixed at the same date as the beginning of his proposed era.

=== Accuracy ===
When Emiliani discussed the calendar in a follow-up article in 1994, he mentioned that there was no agreement on the date of the start of the Holocene epoch, with estimates at the time ranging between 12,700 and 10,970 years BP. Since then, scientists have improved their understanding of the Holocene on the evidence of ice cores and can now more accurately date its beginning. A consensus view was formally adopted by the IUGS in 2013, placing its start at 11,700 years before 2000 (9701 BC), about 300 years more recent than the epoch of the Holocene calendar.

=== Equivalent proposals ===
In 1924 Gabriel Deville proposed the use of Calendrier nouveau de chronologie ancienne (CNCA), which would start 10,000 years before AD 1, which is identical to Emiliani's much later proposal.

Since 1929, Dievturība adherents use Latviskā ēra (the Latvian Era) which begins at the same point; this coincides with the first inhabitants’ influx to the territory of present Latvia (10500–10047 BCE). According to the Latvian Era, 12026 is written for 2026 CE. Detailed explanation of Latvian Era by Ernests Brastiņš was first published in 1934.

In 1963 E.R. Hope proposed the use of Anterior Epoch (AE), which also begins at the same point.

== Conversion ==
Conversion from Julian or Gregorian calendar years to the Human Era can be achieved by adding 10,000 to the AD/CE year. The present year, 2026, can be transformed into a Holocene year by adding the digit "1" before it, making it 12,026 HE. Years BC/BCE are converted by subtracting the BC/BCE year number from 10,001.

Calendar epochs and milestones in the Holocene calendar
Gregorian year	ISO 8601	Holocene year	Event
10002 BC	−10001	−1 HE	
10001 BC	−10000	0 HE	
10000 BC	−9999 (Note: Emiliani states his proposal would set "the beginning of the human era at 10,000 BC" but does not mention the Julian or Gregorian calendar.)	1 HE	Epoch of the Holocene calendar era. Equivalent to 11949 Before Present (BP)
9701 BC	−9700	300 HE	End of the Pleistocene and beginning of the Holocene (geological epoch), equivalent to 11650 BP
5509 BC	−5508	4492 HE	Beginning of the Byzantine calendar
4714 BC	−4713	5287 HE	Epoch of the Julian day system: Julian day 0 starts at Greenwich noon on January 1, 4713 BC of the proleptic Julian calendar, which is November 24, 4714 BC in the proleptic Gregorian calendar This is equivalent to 6,663 BP.
3761 BC	−3760	6240 HE	Beginning of the Anno Mundi calendar era in the Hebrew calendar
~3300 BC	n/a	~6700 HE	Approximate beginning of the Bronze Age
3102 BC	−3101	6899 HE	Beginning of the Kali Yuga in Hindu cosmology
2250 BC	−2249	7751 HE	Beginning of the Meghalayan, the current and latest of the three stages in the Holocene.
~1200 BC	n/a	~8800 HE	Approximate beginning of the Iron Age
753 BC	−0752	9248 HE	Beginning of the ab urbe condita
543 BC	−0542	9458 HE	Beginning of the Buddhist calendar
45 BC	−0044	9956 HE	Introduction of the Julian calendar
1 BC	0000	10000 HE	Year zero at ISO 8601
1 AD	0001	10001 HE	Beginning of the Common Era and Anno Domini, from the estimate by Dionysius Exiguus
622	0622	10622 HE	Migration of Muhammad from Mecca to Medina, starting the Islamic calendar at 1 AH
638	0638	10638 HE	Beginning of the Lesser Era calendar (Chulasakarat calendar)
1582	1582	11582 HE	Introduction of the Gregorian calendar
1912	1912	11912 HE	Epoch of the Juche and Republic of China calendars
1950	1950	11950 HE	Epoch of the Before Present dating scheme
1960	1960	11960 HE	UTC Epoch
1970	1970	11970 HE	Unix Epoch
1993	1993	11993 HE	Publication of the Holocene calendar
2026	2026	12026 HE	Current year
10000	+10000	20000 HE	

== See also ==
- After the Development of Agriculture, a calendar system that adds 8000 years to the Common Era.
- Anno Lucis, a calendar system that adds 4000 years to the Common Era.
- Before Present, the notation most widely used today in scientific literature for dates in prehistory.
- Calendar reform
- Astronomical year numbering, 1 BC is the epoch because there is no year zero in Anno Domini.
