= Conversion between Julian and Gregorian calendars =

The tables below list equivalent dates in the Julian and Gregorian calendars. Years are given in astronomical year numbering.

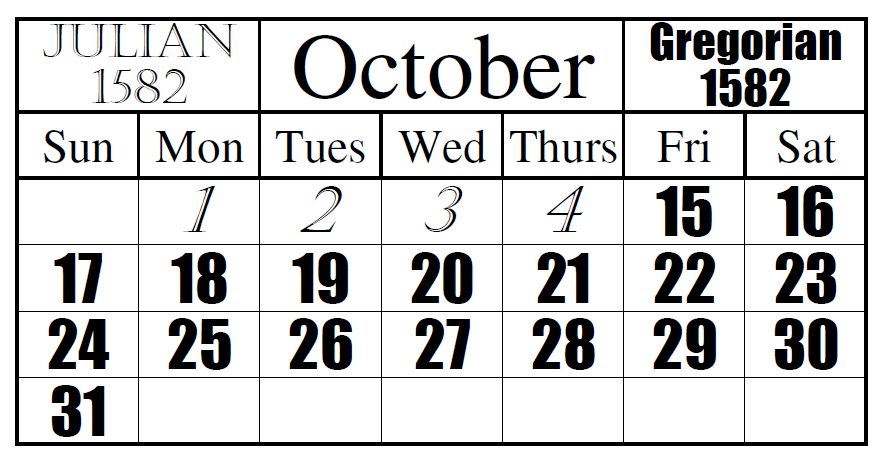
This is a visual example of the official date change from the Julian calendar to the Gregorian

== Conventions ==
- Within these tables, January 1 is always the first day of the year.
- The Gregorian calendar did not exist before October 15, 1582. Gregorian dates before that are proleptic, that is, using the Gregorian rules to reckon backward from October 15, 1582.
- Years are given in astronomical year numbering.
- Augustus corrected errors in the observance of leap years by omitting leap days until AD 8. Julian calendar dates before March AD 4 are proleptic, and do not necessarily match the dates actually observed in the Roman Empire.

== Conversion table ==
This table is taken from the book by the Nautical almanac offices of the United Kingdom and United States originally published in 1961.

Year	Julian date	Gregorian date	Difference
−500	March 5	February 28	
−500	March 6	March 1	−5
−300	March 3	February 27	−5
−300	March 4	February 28	
−300	March 5	March 1	−4
−200	March 2	February 27	−4
−200	March 3	February 28	
−200	March 4	March 1	−3
−100	March 1	February 27	−3
−100	March 2	February 28	
−100	March 3	March 1	−2
100	February 29	February 27	−2
100	March 1	February 28	
100	March 2	March 1	−1
200	February 28	February 27	−1
200	February 29	February 28	
200	March 1	March 1	0
300	February 28	February 28	0
300	February 29	March 1	
300	March 1	March 2	1
Year	Julian date	Gregorian date	Difference
500	February 28	March 1	1
500	February 29	March 2	
500	March 1	March 3	2
600	February 28	March 2	2
600	February 29	March 3	
600	March 1	March 4	3
700	February 28	March 3	3
700	February 29	March 4	
700	March 1	March 5	4
900	February 28	March 4	4
900	February 29	March 5	
900	March 1	March 6	5
Year	Julian date	Gregorian date	Difference
1000	February 28	March 5	5
1000	February 29	March 6	
1000	March 1	March 7	6
1100	February 28	March 6	6
1100	February 29	March 7	
1100	March 1	March 8	7
1300	February 28	March 7	7
1300	February 29	March 8	
1300	March 1	March 9	8
1400	February 28	March 8	8
1400	February 29	March 9	
1400	March 1	March 10	9
1500	February 28	March 9	9
1500	February 29	March 10	
1500	March 1	March 11	10
Year	Julian date	Gregorian date	Difference
1582	October 4	October 14	10
1582	October 5	October 15	10
1582	October 6	October 16	10
1700	February 18	February 28	10
1700	February 19	March 1	11
1700	February 28	March 10	11
1700	February 29	March 11	11
1700	March 1	March 12	11
1800	February 17	February 28	11
1800	February 18	March 1	12
1800	February 28	March 11	12
1800	February 29	March 12	12
1800	March 1	March 13	12
1900	February 16	February 28	12
1900	February 17	March 1	13
1900	February 28	March 12	13
1900	February 29	March 13	13
1900	March 1	March 14	13
2100	February 15	February 28	13
2100	February 16	March 1	14
2100	February 28	March 13	14
2100	February 29	March 14	14

== Using the tables ==
Dates near leap days that are observed in the Julian calendar but not in the Gregorian are listed in the table. Dates near the adoption date in some countries are also listed. For dates not listed, see below.

The usual rules of algebraic addition and subtraction apply; adding a negative number is the same as subtracting the absolute value, and subtracting a negative number is the same as adding the absolute value.

If conversion takes you past a February 29 that exists only in the Julian calendar, then February 29 is counted in the difference. Years affected are those which divide by 100 without remainder but do not divide by 400 without remainder (e.g., 1900 and 2100 but not 2000).

No guidance is provided about conversion of dates before March 5, -500, or after February 29, 2100 (both being Julian dates).

For unlisted dates, find the date in the table closest to, but earlier than, the date to be converted. Be sure to use the correct column. If converting from Julian to Gregorian, add the number from the "Difference" column. If converting from Gregorian to Julian, subtract.

== See also ==
- Revised Julian calendar
