= Proleptic Julian calendar =

Julian calendar extended backwards

The proleptic Julian calendar is produced by extending the Julian calendar backwards to dates preceding AD 8 when the quadrennial leap year stabilized. The leap years that were actually observed between the implementation of the Julian calendar in 45 BC and AD 8 were erratic (see the Julian calendar article for details).

A calendar obtained by extension earlier in time than its invention or implementation is called the "proleptic" version of the calendar. Likewise, the proleptic Gregorian calendar is occasionally used to specify dates before the introduction of the Gregorian calendar in 1582. Because the Julian calendar was used before that time, one must explicitly state that a given quoted date is based on the proleptic Gregorian calendar if that is the case.

The Julian calendar itself was introduced by Julius Caesar, and as such is older than the introduction of the Anno Domini era (or the "Common Era"), counting years since the birth of Christ as calculated by Dionysus Exiguus in the 6th century, and widely used in medieval European annals since about the 8th century, notably by Bede. The proleptic Julian calendar uses Anno Domini throughout, including for dates of Late Antiquity when the Julian calendar was in use but Anno Domini was not, and for times predating the introduction of the Julian calendar. Years are given cardinal numbers, using inclusive counting (AD 1 is the first year of the Anno Domini era, immediately preceded by 1 BC, the first year preceding the Anno Domini era; there is no "zeroth" year). Thus, the year 1 BC of the proleptic Julian calendar is a leap year.

This is to be distinguished from the astronomical year numbering, introduced in 1740 by French astronomer Jacques Cassini, which considers each New Year an integer on a time axis, with year 0 corresponding to 1 BC, and "year −1" corresponding to 2 BC, so that in this system, Julian leap years have a number divisible by four.

The determination of leap years in the proleptic Julian calendar (in either numbering) is distinct from the question of which years were historically considered leap years during the Roman era, due to the leap year error: Between 45 BC and AD 8, the leap day was somewhat unsystematic. Thus there is no simple way to find an equivalent in the proleptic Julian calendar of a date quoted using either the Roman pre-Julian calendar or the Julian calendar before AD 8. The year 46 BC itself is a special case: because of the historical introduction of the Julian calendar in that year, it was allotted 445 days. Before then, the Roman Republican calendar used a system of intercalary months rather than leap days.

== See also ==
- Julian date
- Proleptic Gregorian calendar
