= Crassispira cymation =

Scientific classification
- Kingdom: Animalia
- Phylum: Mollusca
- Class: Gastropoda
- Subclass: Caenogastropoda
- Order: Neogastropoda
- Superfamily: Conoidea
- Family: Pseudomelatomidae
- Genus: Crassispira
- Species: C. cymation

Binomial name
- Crassispira cymation W.P. Woodring, 1970

Synonyms
- † Crassispira (Crassispirella) cymation Woodring 1970

Extinct species of gastropod

Crassispira cymation is an extinct species of sea snail, a marine gastropod mollusk in the family Pseudomelatomidae, the turrids and allies. Crassispira dates to the Miocene Epoch. The fossil remains of the gastropod were found in rock strata in the coastal areas of modern-day Panama. During the Miocene Epoch, some parts of the Mexican Peninsula were underwater, which would have provided a suitable habitat for Crassispira.

== History ==
The species dates to the Miocene Epoch but may have lived in other epochs.

== Location ==
The snail likely lived in the Central America region or greater.

== Description ==
The length of the shell attains 8 mm, its diameter is 3.3 mm.

== Distribution ==
Fossils have been found in Miocene strata in modern-day Panama; age range: 11.608 to 7.246 Ma.
