= Chinese calendar correspondence table =

Relationship between the current Sexagenary cycle and Gregorian calendar

This Chinese calendar correspondence table shows the stem/branch year names, correspondences to the Western (Gregorian) calendar, and other related information for the current, 79th sexagenary cycle of the Chinese calendar based on the 2697 BC epoch or the 78th cycle if using the 2637 BC epoch.

Year in cycle	s,b	Gānzhī (干支)	Year of the ...	AD	AM	Timestamp	AH	Begins
1	1,1	jiǎzǐ (甲子)	Wood Rat	1984	73	0712-0901	4681	February 2
2	2,2	yǐchǒu (乙丑)	Wood Ox	1985	74	0712-0902	4682	February 20
3	3,3	bǐngyín (丙寅)	Fire Tiger	1986	75	0712-0903	4683	February 9
4	4,4	dīngmǎo (丁卯)	Fire Rabbit	1987	76	0712-0904	4684	January 29
5	5,5	wùchén (戊辰)	Earth Dragon	1988	77	0712-0905	4685	February 17
6	6,6	jǐsì (己巳)	Earth Snake	1989	78	0712-0906	4686	February 6
7	7,7	gēngwǔ (庚午)	Golden Horse	1990	79	0712-0907	4687	January 27
8	8,8	xīnwèi (辛未)	Golden Goat	1991	80	0712-0908	4688	February 15
9	9,9	rénshēn (壬申)	Water Monkey	1992	81	0712-0909	4689	February 4
10	10,10	guǐyǒu (癸酉)	Water Rooster	1993	82	0712-0910	4690	January 23
11	1,11	jiǎxū (甲戌)	Wood Dog	1994	83	0712-0911	4691	February 9
12	2,12	yǐhài (乙亥)	Wood Pig	1995	84	0712-0912	4692	January 31
13	3,1	bǐngzǐ (丙子)	Fire Rat	1996	85	0712-0913	4693	February 19
14	4,2	dīngchǒu (丁丑)	Fire Ox	1997	86	0712-0914	4694	February 7
15	5,3	wùyín (戊寅)	Earth Tiger	1998	87	0712-0915	4695	January 28
16	6,4	jǐmǎo (己卯)	Earth Rabbit	1999	88	0712-0916	4696	February 16
17	7,5	gēngchén (庚辰)	Golden Dragon	2000	89	0712-0917	4697	February 5
18	8,6	xīnsì (辛巳)	Golden Snake	2001	90	0712-0918	4698	January 24
19	9,7	rénwǔ (壬午)	Water Horse	2002	91	0712-0919	4699	February 12
20	10,8	guǐwèi (癸未)	Water Goat	2003	92	0712-0920	4700	February 1
21	1,9	jiǎshēn (甲申)	Wood Monkey	2004	93	0712-0921	4701	January 22
22	2,10	yǐyǒu (乙酉)	Wood Rooster	2005	94	0712-0922	4702	February 9
23	3,11	bǐngxū (丙戌)	Fire Dog	2006	95	0712-0923	4703	January 29
24	4,12	dīnghài (丁亥)	Fire Pig	2007	96	0712-0924	4704	February 18
25	5,1	wùzǐ (戊子)	Earth Rat	2008	97	0712-0925	4705	February 7
26	6,2	jǐchǒu (己丑)	Earth Ox	2009	98	0712-0926	4706	January 26
27	7,3	gēngyín (庚寅)	Golden Tiger	2010	99	0712-0927	4707	February 14
28	8,4	xīnmǎo (辛卯)	Golden Rabbit	2011	100	0712-0928	4708	February 3
29	9,5	rénchén (壬辰)	Water Dragon	2012	101	0712-0929	4709	January 23
30	10,6	guǐsì (癸巳)	Water Snake	2013	102	0712-0930	4710	February 10
31	1,7	jiǎwǔ (甲午)	Wood Horse	2014	103	0712-1001	4711	January 31
32	2,8	yǐwèi (乙未)	Wood Goat	2015	104	0712-1002	4712	February 19
33	3,9	bǐngshēn (丙申)	Fire Monkey	2016	105	0712-1003	4713	February 8
34	4,10	dīngyǒu (丁酉)	Fire Rooster	2017	106	0712-1004	4714	January 28
35	5,11	wùxū (戊戌)	Earth Dog	2018	107	0712-1005	4715	February 16
36	6,12	jǐhài (己亥)	Earth Pig	2019	108	0712-1006	4716	February 5
37	7,1	gēngzǐ (庚子)	Golden Rat	2020	109	0712-1007	4717	January 25
38	8,2	xīnchǒu (辛丑)	Golden Ox	2021	110	0712-1008	4718	February 12
39	9,3	rényín (壬寅)	Water Tiger	2022	111	0712-1009	4719	February 1
40	10,4	guǐmǎo (癸卯)	Water Rabbit	2023	112	0712-1010	4720	January 22
41	1,5	jiǎchén (甲辰)	Wood Dragon	2024	113	0712-1011	4721	February 10
42	2,6	yǐsì (乙巳)	Wood Snake	2025	114	0712-1012	4722	January 29
43	3,7	bǐngwǔ (丙午)	Fire Horse	2026	115	0712-1013	4723	February 17
44	4,8	dīngwèi (丁未)	Fire Goat	2027	116	0712-1014	4724	February 6
45	5,9	wùshēn (戊申)	Earth Monkey	2028	117	0712-1015	4725	January 26
46	6,10	jǐyǒu (己酉)	Earth Rooster	2029	118	0712-1016	4726	February 13
47	7,11	gēngxū (庚戌)	Golden Dog	2030	119	0712-1017	4727	February 3
48	8,12	xīnhài (辛亥)	Golden Pig	2031	120	0712-1018	4728	January 23
49	9,1	rénzǐ (壬子)	Water Rat	2032	121	0712-1019	4729	February 11
50	10,2	guǐchǒu (癸丑)	Water Ox	2033	122	0712-1020	4730	January 31
51	1,3	jiǎyín (甲寅)	Wood Tiger	2034	123	0712-1021	4731	February 19
52	2,4	yǐmǎo (乙卯)	Wood Rabbit	2035	124	0712-1022	4732	February 8
53	3,5	bǐngchén (丙辰)	Fire Dragon	2036	125	0712-1023	4733	January 28
54	4,6	dīngsì (丁巳)	Fire Snake	2037	126	0712-1024	4734	February 15
55	5,7	wùwǔ (戊午)	Earth Horse	2038	127	0712-1025	4735	February 4
56	6,8	jǐwèi (己未)	Earth Goat	2039	128	0712-1026	4736	January 24
57	7,9	gēngshēn (庚申)	Metal Monkey	2040	129	0712-1027	4737	February 12
58	8,10	xīnyǒu (辛酉)	Metal Rooster	2041	130	0712-1028	4738	February 1
59	9,11	rénxū (壬戌)	Water Dog	2042	131	0712-1029	4739	January 22
60	10,12	guǐhài (癸亥)	Water Pig	2043	132	0712-1030	4740	February 10
