= Epoch =

Reference point from which time is measured

In chronology and periodization, an epoch or reference epoch is an instant in time chosen as the origin of a particular calendar era. The "epoch" serves as a reference point from which time is measured.

The moment of epoch is usually decided by congruity, or by following conventions understood from the epoch in question. The epoch moment or date is usually defined from a specific, clear event of change, an epoch event. Where a historical shift is gradual, the epoch is defined as the precise moment a critical threshold is crossed.

== Calendar eras ==
=== Pre-modern eras ===
- Anno Mundi [lit. "Year of the World"] (years since the creation of the world) is used in
  - the Byzantine calendar (5509 BC).
  - the Hebrew calendar (3761 BC).
- The Mesoamerican Long Count Calendar uses the creation of the fourth world in 3114 BC.
- Olympiads, the ancient Greek era of four-year periods between Olympic Games, beginning in 776 BC.
- Ab urbe condita ("from the foundation of the city"), used to some extent by Roman calendars of the Roman imperial period (753 BC).
- Buddhist calendars tend to use the epoch of 544 BC (date of Buddha's parinirvana).
- The term Hindu calendar may refer to a number of traditional Indian calendars. A notable example of a Hindu epoch is the Vikram Samvat (58 BC), also used in modern times as the national calendars of Nepal and Bangladesh.
- The Julian and Gregorian calendars use as epoch the Incarnation of Jesus as calculated in the 6th century by Dionysius Exiguus. (Subsequent research has shown that this moment is about four years after the best estimate for the date of birth of Jesus.) This epoch was applied retrospectively to the Julian calendar, long after its original creation by Julius Caesar.
- The epoch of the Islamic calendar is the Hijra (AD 622). The year count in this calendar shifts relative to the solar year count, as the calendar is purely lunar: its year consists of 12 lunations and is thus ten or eleven days shorter than a solar year. This calendar denotes "lunar years" as Anno Hegiræ ([since] the year of the Hijra) or AH. This calendar is used in Sunni Islam and related sects.
- The epoch of the official Iranian calendar is also the Hijra, but it is a solar calendar; each year begins at the Northern spring equinox. This calendar is used in Shia Islam and related sects.

=== Modern eras ===
- The Bahá'í calendar is dated from the vernal equinox of the year the Báb proclaimed his religion (AD 1844). Years are grouped in Váḥids of 19 years, and Kull-i-Shay of 361 (19×19) years.
- In Thailand in 1888 King Chulalongkorn decreed a National Thai Era dating from the founding of Bangkok on April 6, 1782. In 1912, New Year's Day was shifted to April 1. In 1941, Prime Minister Phibunsongkhram decided to count the years since 543 BC. This is the Thai solar calendar using the Thai Buddhist Era. Except for this era, it is the Gregorian calendar.
- In the French Republican Calendar, a calendar used by the French government for about twelve years from late 1793, the epoch was the beginning of the "Republican Era", September 22, 1792 (the day the French First Republic was proclaimed, one day after the Convention abolished the Ancien Regime).
- The Indian national calendar, introduced in 1957, follows the Saka era (AD 78).
- The Minguo calendar used by officials of Taiwan and its predecessor dates from January 1, 1912, the first year after the Xinhai Revolution, which overthrew the Qing Empire.
- Until 2024, North Korea used a system that starts in 1912 (= Juche 1), the year of the birth of its founder Kim Il-Sung.
- The Fascist Era dates to Mussolini's March on Rome in 1922, and was in use only in countries under hegemony of the Fascist regime of Benito Mussolini. It has been defunct since the fall of the Italian Social Republic in 1945.
- In the scientific Before Present system of numbering years for purposes of radiocarbon dating, the reference date is January 1, 1950 (though the specific date January 1 is quite unnecessary, as radiocarbon dating has limited precision).
- Different branches of Freemasonry have selected different years to date their documents according to a Masonic era, such as the Anno Lucis (A.L.).
- The Holocene calendar uses 10,000 BC as the epoch, a rough approximation of the beginning of the Holocene epoch on the geological time scale.
- Astronomical year numbering: 1 BC is the epoch, because there is no year zero in Anno Domini.
- Unix time uses 00:00:00 UTC on 1 January 1970 as the epoch.

=== Regnal eras ===
The official Japanese system numbers years from the accession of the current emperor, regarding the calendar year during which the accession occurred as the first year. A similar system existed in China before 1912, being based on the accession year of the emperor (1911 was thus the third year of the Xuantong period). With the establishment of the Republic of China in 1912, the republican era was introduced. It is still very common in Taiwan to date events via the republican era. The People's Republic of China adopted the common era calendar in 1949 (the 38th year of the Chinese Republic).

Canada uses regnal eras in the system it inherited from the United Kingdom for its Acts of Parliament, where it is currently 4 Charles III; however, the conventional Gregorian year is used as well. That system was also used in the United Kingdom and Kingdom of England from 1307 until 1963, when the Gregorian calendar was officially adopted.

=== Fictional eras ===
- Events in the Star Wars universe are conventionally dated using an epoch of the Battle of Yavin.
- Events in the Avatar: The Last Airbender universe are conventionally dated using an epoch of the genocide of the air nomads.

== See also ==
- Dating creation – Using creation myths to date the Earth
- Era – Span of time defined for the purposes of chronology or historiography
- Geologic time scale – System that relates geologic strata to time
- Lunisolar calendar – Calendar with lunar month, solar year
- Metonic cycle – 19 solar year recurrence of lunar phases
- Saros (astronomy) – Length of time after which an eclipse repeats
- Timekeeping on Mars – Proposed approaches to tracking date and time on the planet Mars
- Year zero – Year used in some calendars
