= List of adoption dates of the Gregorian calendar by country =

This is a list of adoption dates of the Gregorian calendar by country. For explanation, see the article about the Gregorian calendar.

Except where stated otherwise, the transition was a move by the civil authorities from the Julian to the Gregorian calendar. In religious sources it could be that the Julian calendar was used for a longer period of time, in particular by Protestant and Eastern Orthodox churches. The historic area does not necessarily match the present-day area or country. The column "Present country" provides only a logic search entry. With a few exceptions, the former colonies of European powers are not shown separately.

There are only four countries which have not adopted the Gregorian calendar for civil use: Ethiopia (Ethiopian calendar), Nepal (Vikram Samvat and Nepal Sambat), Iran (Solar Hijri calendar) and Afghanistan (Solar Hijri calendar). Thailand has adopted the Gregorian calendar for days and months, but uses its own era for years: the Buddhist era. Many countries also continue to use traditional calendars for religious and ceremonial purposes.

== List ==
Legend

Abandoning the Gregorian calendar

Present country	Historic area	Year	Date of the last day before the change	Date of the first day after the change	Number of dates omitted	Particulars	Source
Albania	Albania	1912	14 Nov	28 Nov	13	Albanian Catholics have used the Gregorian calendar since 5 Oct 1583.	
Armenia	Transcaucasian Democratic Federative Republic	1918	17 Apr	1 May	13		
Austria	Carinthia	1583	14 Dec	25 Dec	10		
Austria	Lower Austria	1583	20 Oct	31 Oct	10		
Austria	Salzburg	1583	10 Feb	21 Feb	10		
Austria	Styria	1583	11 Dec	22 Dec	10		
Austria	Tyrol, Further Austria	1583	4 Oct	15 Oct	10		
Austria	Upper Austria	1583	20 Oct	31 Oct	10		
Azerbaijan	Transcaucasian Democratic Federative Republic	1918	17 Apr	1 May	13		
Belarus	Grand Duchy of Lithuania	1585	21 Dec	1 Jan (1586)	10		
Belarus	Lithuania Governorate	1800	11 Jan	1 Jan	-11	Return to the Julian calendar	
Belarus	Grodno Governorate	1915	22 Aug	5 Sept	13		
Belarus	Soviet Russia	1918	31 Jan	14 Feb	13		
Belgium	Flanders	1582	14 Dec	25 Dec	10	Edict of Francis, Duke of Anjou followed	
Belgium	Liège	1583	10 Feb	21 Feb	10	Edict of Philip II of Spain followed	
Belgium	Southern Netherlands	1582	20 Dec	31 Dec	10	or one day later; areas under Spanish rule: Artois, occupied Brabant, occupied Flanders, Hainaut, Limburg, Luxemburg, Namur	
Bulgaria	Bulgaria	1916	31 Mar	14 Apr	13		
Cambodia	French colonial empire	1863			N/A	Previously used the Burmese calendar.	
Canada	French colonial empire	1582	9 Dec	20 Dec	10		
Canada	Nova Scotia	1710	13 Oct	3 Oct	-11	Return to the Julian calendar	
Canada	British Empire	1752	2 Sep	14 Sep	11		
China	China	1911	12 "11th Month"	1 Jan (1912)	N/A	Previously used the Chinese calendar. Because of a civil war, the official transition did not end until 1929, with Minguo year numbering remaining in use until 1949.	
Czech Republic	Bohemia	1584	6 Jan	17 Jan	10		
Czech Republic	Moravia	1584	15 Oct	26 Oct	10	Estates initially refused the change ordered early October.	
Czech Republic	Silesia	1584	6 Jan	17 Jan	10	Excluding the Duchy of Krnov	
Czech Republic	Duchy of Krnov	1584	6 Mar	17 Mar	10		
Denmark	Denmark-Norway	1700	18 Feb	1 Mar	11		
Egypt	Egypt	1875	6 Epag.	11 Sept	N/A	Previously used the Alexandrian calendar for fiscal purposes	
Estonia	Estonia	1918	15 Feb	1 Mar	13		
Faroe Islands	Norway	1700	16 Nov	28 Nov	11		
France	France	1582	9 Dec	20 Dec	10	Excluding Alsace and Lorraine	
France	France	1793	23 Sep	3 Vend. (II)	N/A	Introduction of the French Republican calendar	
France	France	1805	10 Niv. (XIV)	1 Jan 1806	N/A	The French Republican calendar ended.	
France	Sedan	1582	9 Dec	20 Dec	10		
France	Austrian Upper Alsace and Breisgau	1583	13 Oct	24 Oct	10		
France	Roman Catholic Archdiocese of Strasbourg	1583	16 Nov	27 Nov	10		
France	Alsace, Protestant parts (except Mulhouse, see below), i.e. Strasbourg, and, on same date or shortly after, Protestant parishes over Alsace	1682	5 Feb	16 Feb	10		
France	Lorraine	1582	9 Dec	20 Dec	10		
France	Lorraine	1735			-11	Return to the Julian calendar	
France	Lorraine	1760	16 Feb	28 Feb	11		
France	Mulhouse	1700	31 Dec	12 Jan (1701)	11		
Germany	Aachen	1582	31 Dec	11 Jan (1583)	10		
Germany	Augsburg	1583	13 Feb	24 Feb	10		
Germany	Margraviate of Baden-Baden	1583	16 Nov	27 Nov	10		
Germany	Duchy of Bavaria, Prince-Bishopric of Regensburg, Prince-Bishopric of Freising, Prince-Bishopric of Eichstätt	1583	5 Oct	16 Oct	10		
Germany	Biberach	1603	12 Feb	23 Feb	10	Protestants did not largely accept the new calendar until 30 Nov 1604.	
Germany	Electorate of Cologne, Imperial City of Cologne	1583	2 Nov	13 Nov	10		
Germany	Prince-Bishopric of Constance	1584	8 Feb	19 Feb	10		
Germany	Prince-Provostry of Ellwangen	1583	14 Feb	25 Feb	10		
Germany	Further Austria	1583	4 Oct	15 Oct	10	Including Breisgau, Swabian Austria, Ortenau	
Germany	Prince-Bishopric of Hildesheim	1631	15 Mar	26 Mar	10	Excluding the city of Hildesheim itself	
Germany	Hildesheim	1632	14 Dec	25 Dec	10		
Germany	Duchy of Jülich, Duchy of Berg	1583	2 Nov	13 Nov	10		
Germany	Kaufbeuren	1583	13 Feb	24 Feb	10		
Germany	Lusatia	1584	6 Jan	17 Jan	10	Some Upper Lusatian towns delayed adoption, latest was Königsbrück in May 1584.	
Germany	Electorate of Mainz	1583	11 Nov	22 Nov	10	Local resistance in Erfurt until 1700	
Germany	Prince-Bishopric of Minden	1668	1 Feb	12 Feb	10		
Germany	Prince-Bishopric of Münster, Duchy of Cleves, County of Mark	1583	16 Nov	27 Nov	10		
Germany	Prince-Bishopric of Osnabrück	1624	14 Nov	25 Nov	10		
Germany	Prince-Bishopric of Paderborn	1585	16 Jun	27 Jun	10		
Germany	Electoral Palatinate	1686	11 Feb	22 Feb	10		
Germany	Duchy of Palatinate-Neuburg	1615	13 Dec	24 Dec	10		
Germany	Prince-Bishopric of Passau	1582	4 Oct	15 Oct	10		
Germany	Ravensburg	1584	8 Feb	19 Feb	10		
Germany	Electorate of Trier	1583	4 Oct	15 Oct	10		
Germany	Duchy of Westphalia	1584	1 Jul	12 Jul	10		
Germany	Prince-Bishopric of Würzburg	1583	4 Nov	15 Nov	10		
Germany	Germany, Protestant parts	1700	18 Feb	1 Mar	11		
Georgia	Transcaucasian Democratic Federative Republic	1918	17 Apr	1 May	13		
Greece	Greece	1923	15 Feb	1 Mar	13	Excluding Mount Athos	
Hungary	Hungary	1587	21 Oct	1 Nov	10		
Iceland	Norway	1700	16 Nov	28 Nov	11		
Ireland	O'Neill and O'Donnell Gaelic Lordships in Ulster	1584			10	Papal dispensation to return to Julian calendar applied for in 1630, in operation by 1641	
Ireland	Kingdom of Ireland	1752	2 Sept	14 Sept	11	The British Calendar (New Style) Act 1750 also applied to Ireland (as stated in its preamble). For details, see Calendar Act: Ireland.	
Italy	various	1582	4 Oct	15 Oct	10		
Italy	County of Tyrol, Prince-Bishopric of Brixen	1583	4 Oct	15 Oct	10	Brixen possibly one day later	
Japan	Japan	1872	2 "12th month"	1 Jan (1873)	N/A	Previously used the Japanese calendar. Japanese era names still remain in use.	
Laos	French colonial empire	1889			N/A	Previously used the Burmese calendar.	
Latvia	Courland	1617			10		
Latvia	Courland	1796	7 Feb	28 Jan	-11	Return to the Julian calendar	
Latvia	Courland	1915	11 May	25 May	13		
Latvia	Livland	1915	22 Aug	5 Sept	13		
Lithuania	Grand Duchy of Lithuania	1585	21 Dec	1 Jan (1586)	10		
Lithuania	Lithuania Governorate	1800	11 Jan	1 Jan	-11	Return to the Julian calendar	
Lithuania	Kovno and Vilna Governorates	1915	11 May	25 May	13		
Lithuania	Duchy of Prussia	1610	22 Aug	2 Sept	10	North eastern Ducal Prussia is now part of Lithuania.	
Luxembourg	Duchy of Luxemburg	1582	20 Dec	31 Dec	10		
Montenegro	Yugoslavia	1919	14 Jan	28 Jan	13		
Myanmar	Burma (British Empire)	1885			N/A	Previously used the Burmese calendar.	
Netherlands	Brabant	1582	14 Dec	25 Dec	10	Edict of Francis, Duke of Anjou followed	
Netherlands	Drenthe	1701	30 Apr	12 May	11		
Netherlands	Frisia	1700	31 Dec	12 Jan (1701)	11		
Netherlands	Gelderland	1700	30 Jun	12 Jul	11		
Netherlands	Groningen (city)	1583	1 Mar	12 Mar	10	Edict of Philip II of Spain was: 10 followed by 21 February (proclaimed later)	
Netherlands	Groningen (city)	1594	19 Nov	10 Nov	-10	Return to the Julian calendar	
Netherlands	Groningen (province)	1700	31 Dec	12 Jan (1701)	11	Stad and Ommelanden	
Netherlands	Holland	1583	1 Jan	12 Jan	10	Edict of Francis, Duke of Anjou followed later on	
Netherlands	Overijssel	1700	30 Nov	12 Dec	11		
Netherlands	States General	1582	14 Dec	25 Dec	10	Edict of Francis, Duke of Anjou followed	
Netherlands	Utrecht	1700	30 Nov	12 Dec	11		
Netherlands	Zeeland	1582	14 Dec	25 Dec	10	Edict of Francis, Duke of Anjou followed	
North Korea	Joseon	1895	16 "11th month"	1 Jan (1896)	N/A	Previously used the Korean calendar. In addition to the Gregorian calendar, the Juche calendar was in use between 1997 and 2024.	
North Macedonia	Yugoslavia	1919	14 Jan	28 Jan	13		
Norway	Denmark-Norway	1700	18 Feb	1 Mar	11		
Poland	Poland	1582	4 Oct	15 Oct	10	Local resistance	
Poland	Duchy of Prussia	1610	22 Aug	2 Sept	10	Southern Ducal Prussia is now part of Poland	
Poland	Silesia	1584	6 Jan	17 Jan	10	Excluding Wrocław, Wąsosz, Wołów, Bolesławiec, Świdnica	
Poland	Wrocław, Wąsosz, Wołów, Bolesławiec	1584	18 Jan	29 Jan	10		
Poland	Świdnica	1584	11 Jan	22 Jan	10		
Poland	Margraviate of Brandenburg	1700	18 Feb	1 Mar	11	Along with the other Prostestant Imperial Estates	
Portugal	Portuguese Empire	1582	4 Oct	15 Oct	10		
Romania	Principality of Transylvania	1590	14 Dec	25 Dec	10		
Romania	Romania	1919	31 Mar	14 Apr	13		
Russia	Duchy of Prussia	1610	22 Aug	2 Sept	10	Northern Ducal Prussia is now part of Russia.	
Russia	Russia	1918	31 Jan	14 Feb	13		
Saudi Arabia	Saudi Arabia	2016	28 DaH (1437)	1 Oct	N/A	Previously used the Islamic calendar.	
Serbia	Yugoslavia	1919	14 Jan	28 Jan	13		
Slovenia	Duchy of Carniola	1583	4 Oct	15 Oct	10		
Slovenia	Duchy of Styria	1583	11 Dec	22 Dec	10		
Spain	Spanish Empire	1582	4 Oct	15 Oct	10		
South Korea	Joseon	1895	16 "11th month"	1 Jan (1896)	N/A	Previously used the Korean calendar.	
Sweden	Swedish Empire	1700	28 Feb	1 Mar	1	Including Finland; introduction of the Swedish calendar	
Sweden	Swedish Empire	1712	30 Feb (sic)	1 Mar	-1	Including Finland; return to the Julian calendar	
Sweden	Sweden	1753	17 Feb	1 Mar	11	Including Finland	
Switzerland	Roman Catholic Diocese of Basel	1583	20 Oct	31 Oct	10		
Switzerland	Luzern, Uri, Schwyz, Zug, Freiburg, Solothurn, Le Landeron	1584	11 Jan	22 Jan	10		
Switzerland	Obwalden, Nidwalden	1584	11 Feb	22 Feb	10		
Switzerland	Thurgau, Appenzell Innerrhoden, Appenzell Ausserrhoden	1584			10		
Switzerland	Appenzell Ausserrhoden	1597			-10	Return to the Julian calendar	
Switzerland	Lower Valais	1623			10		
Switzerland	Graubünden (Catholic parts)	1623–1624			10		
Switzerland	Valais	1655	28 Feb	11 Mar	10		
Switzerland	Switzerland, Protestant parts	1700	31 Dec	12 Jan (1701)	11	Basel, Bern, Neuchâtel, Sargans, Schaffhausen, Geneva and Zürich	
Switzerland	Glarus (Catholic part)	1700	31 Dec	12 Jan (1701)	11		
Switzerland	City of St. Gallen	1724			11		
Switzerland	Glarus (Protestant part)	1798	22 Jun	4 Jul	11		
Switzerland	Appenzell Ausserrhoden	1798	13 Dec	25 Dec	11		
Switzerland	Graubünden (Protestant part)	1783–1811			11–12	Communes changed at different times. Oberengadin and Bergel changed in 1783. In Schiers and Grüsch, 25 Dec 1811 was followed by 7 Jan 1812.	
Thailand	Siam	1889		1 Apr	N/A	Previously used the Thai lunar calendar. The year numbering followed the Rattanakosin Era until 1912, when it was replaced by the Buddhist era; see Thai solar calendar.	
Turkey	Ottoman Empire	1917	15 Feb	1 Mar	13	The year numbering followed the Rumi calendar until 1 Jan 1926, when the Anno Domini era was adopted.	
Uganda	British Empire	1893	31 Dec	13 Jan (1894)	12		
Ukraine	Ukrainian People's Republic	1918	15 Feb	1 Mar	13		
United Kingdom	Kingdom of Great Britain and Kingdom of Ireland	1752	2 Sept	14 Sept	11	The Calendar (New Style) Act 1750 was passed to ensure alignment with the rest of Europe, but made no reference to Gregory.	
United States of America	French colonial empire and Spanish Empire	1582	9 Dec	20 Dec	10		
United States of America	British Empire	1752	2 Sept	14 Sept	11	Some States adopted as their Common Law the laws of England in 1607, prior to the New Style Calendar Act.	
United States of America	Russian Empire	1867	6 Oct	18 Oct	11	Alaska adopted the Gregorian calendar on incorporation into the United States, which preceded adoption by Russia. The International Date Line was changed, so only 11 days were omitted (a Friday was followed by another Friday).	

== See also ==
- cal (command)
- Adoption of the Gregorian calendar
- Old Style and New Style dates
