= Year zero =

Year used in some calendars

A year zero is a date where the current year for a given calendar system is zero. In systems which include a year zero, this year would be the epoch. Year zero does not exist in the Anno Domini (AD) calendar year system commonly used to number years in the Gregorian calendar and Julian calendar. Instead, AD 1 is treated as the epoch, so that the year 1 BC is followed directly by year AD 1. However, there is a year zero in both the astronomical year numbering system (where it coincides with the Julian year 1 BC), and the ISO 8601:2004 system, a data interchange standard for certain time and calendar information (where year zero coincides with the Gregorian year 1 BC;. There is also a year zero in most Buddhist and Hindu calendars.

== History ==
The Anno Domini era was introduced in 525 by Scythian monk Dionysius Exiguus (c. 470 – c. 544), who used it to identify the years on his Easter table. He introduced the new era to avoid using the Diocletian era, based on the accession of Roman emperor Diocletian, as he did not wish to continue the memory of a persecutor of Christians. In the preface to his Easter table, Dionysius stated that the "present year" was "the consulship of Probus Junior" which was also 525 years "since the incarnation of our Lord Jesus Christ". How he arrived at that number is unknown.

Dionysius Exiguus did not use "AD" years to date any historical event. This practice began with the English cleric Bede (c. 672 – 735), who used AD years in his Historia ecclesiastica gentis Anglorum (731), popularizing the era. Bede also used – only once – a term similar to the modern English term "before Christ", though the practice did not catch on for nearly a thousand years, when books by Denis Pétau treating calendar science gained popularity. Bede did not sequentially number days of the month, weeks of the year, or months of the year. However, he did number many of the days of the week using the counting origin one in Ecclesiastical Latin.

Previous Christian histories used several titles for dating events: anno mundi ("in the year of the world") beginning on the purported first day of creation; or anno Adami ("in the year of Adam") beginning at the creation of Adam five days later (or the sixth day of creation according to the Genesis creation narrative) as used by Africanus; or anno Abrahami ("in the year of Abraham") beginning 3,412 years after Creation according to the Septuagint, used by Eusebius of Caesarea; all of which assigned "one" to the year beginning at Creation, or the creation of Adam, or the birth of Abraham, respectively. Bede continued this earlier tradition relative to the AD era.

In chapter II of book I of Ecclesiastical History, Bede stated that Julius Caesar invaded Britain "in the year 693 after the building of Rome, but the 60th year before the incarnation of our Lord", while stating in chapter III, "in the year of Rome 798, Claudius" also invaded Britain and "within a very few days ... concluded the war in ... the 46th [year] from the incarnation of our Lord". Although both dates are wrong, they are sufficient to conclude that Bede did not include a year zero between BC and AD: 798 − 693 + 1 (because the years are inclusive) = 106, but 60 + 46 = 106, which leaves no room for a year zero. The modern English term "before Christ" (BC) is only a rough equivalent, not a direct translation, of Bede's Latin phrase ante incarnationis dominicae tempus ("before the time of the lord's incarnation"), which was itself never abbreviated. Bede's singular use of 'BC' continued to be used sporadically throughout the Middle Ages.

Neither the concept of nor a symbol for zero existed in the system of Roman numerals. The Babylonian system of the BC era had used the idea of "nothingness" without considering it a number, and the Romans enumerated in much the same way. Wherever a modern zero would have been used, Bede and Dionysius Exiguus did use Latin number words, or the word nulla (meaning "nothing") alongside Roman numerals. Zero was invented in India in the sixth century, and was either transferred or reinvented by the Arabs by about the eighth century. The Arabic numeral for zero (0) did not enter Europe until the 13th century. Even then, it was known only to very few, and only entered widespread use in Europe by the 17th century.

The anno Domini nomenclature was not widely used in Western Europe until the 9th century, and the 1 January to 31 December historical year was not uniform throughout Western Europe until 1752. The first extensive use (hundreds of times) of 'BC' occurred in Fasciculus Temporum by Werner Rolevinck in 1474, alongside years of the world (anno mundi). The terms anno Domini, Dionysian era, Christian era, vulgar era, and common era were used interchangeably between the Renaissance and the 19th century, at least in Latin. But vulgar era fell out of use in English at the beginning of the 20th century after vulgar acquired the meaning of "offensively coarse", replacing its original meaning of "common" or "ordinary". Consequently, historians regard all these eras as equal.

Historians have never included a year zero. This means that between, for example, 1 January 500 BC and 1 January AD 500, there are 999 years: 500 years BC, and 499 years AD preceding 500. In common usage anno Domini 1 is preceded by the year 1 BC, without an intervening year zero. Neither the choice of calendar system (whether Julian or Gregorian) nor the name of the era (Anno Domini or Common Era) determines whether a year zero will be used. If writers do not use the convention of their group (historians or astronomers), they must explicitly state whether they include a year 0 in their count of years, otherwise their historical dates will be misunderstood.

== Astronomy ==
In astronomy, for the year AD 1 and later it is common to assign the same numbers as the Anno Domini notation, which in turn is numerically equivalent to the Common Era notation. But the discontinuity between AD 1 and 1 BC makes it cumbersome to compare ancient and modern dates. So the year before AD 1 is designated 0, the year before 0 is −1, and so on.

The letters "AD", "BC", "CE", or "BCE" are omitted. So 1 BC in historical notation is equivalent to 0 in astronomical notation, 2 BC is equivalent to −1, etc. Sometimes positive years are preceded by the + sign. This year numbering notation was introduced by the astronomer Jacques Cassini in 1740.

=== History of astronomical usage ===
In 1627, the German astronomer Johannes Kepler, in his Rudolphine Tables, first used an astronomical year essentially as a year zero. He labeled it Christi and inserted it between years labeled Ante Christum and Post Christum—abbreviated BC and AD today, respectively—on the "mean motion" pages of the Sun, Moon, and planets. In 1702, the French astronomer Philippe de La Hire labeled a year as Christum 0 and placed it at the end of the years labeled ante Christum (BC), and immediately before the years labeled post Christum (AD), on the mean motion pages in his Tabulæ Astronomicæ, thus adding the number designation 0 to Kepler's Christi.

Finally, in 1740, the transition was completed by French astronomer Jacques Cassini (Cassini II), who is traditionally credited with inventing year zero. In his Tables astronomiques, Cassini labeled the year simply as 0, and placed it at the end of years labeled avant Jesus-Christ (BC), and immediately before years labeled après Jesus-Christ (AD).

== ISO 8601 ==
ISO 8601:2004 (and previously ISO 8601:2000, but not ISO 8601:1988) explicitly uses astronomical year numbering in its date reference systems. Because it also specifies the use of the proleptic Gregorian calendar for all years before 1582, some readers incorrectly assume that a year zero is also included in that proleptic calendar, but it is not used with the BC/AD era. The "basic" format for year 0 is the four-digit form 0000, which equals the historical year 1 BC. Several "expanded" formats are possible: −0000 and +0000, as well as five- and six-digit versions. Earlier years are also negative four-, five- or six-digit years, which have an absolute value one less than the equivalent BC year, hence -0001 = 2 BC. Because only ISO 646 (7-bit ASCII) characters are allowed by ISO 8601, the minus sign is represented by a hyphen-minus.

== Computing ==
Programming libraries may implement a year zero, an example being the Perl CPAN module DateTime.

== Indian calendars ==
Most eras used with Hindu and Buddhist calendars, such as the Saka era or the Kali Yuga, begin with the year 0. These calendars mostly use elapsed, expired, or complete years, in contrast with most calendars from other parts of the world which use current years. A complete year had not yet elapsed for any date in the initial year of the epoch, thus the number 1 cannot be used. Instead, during the first year the indication of 0 years (elapsed) is given in order to show that the epoch is less than 1 year old. This is similar to the Western method of stating a person's age—people do not reach age one until one year has elapsed since birth (but their age during the year beginning at birth is specified in months or fractional years, not as age zero). However, if ages were specified in years and months, such a person would be said to be, for example, 0 years and 6 months or 0.5 years old. This is analogous to the way time is shown on a 24-hour clock: during the first hour of a day, the time elapsed is 0 hours, n minutes.

== See also ==
- List of non-standard dates
- Time formatting and storage bugs
- Zero-based numbering
- Off-by-one error
