= Astronomical year numbering =

Year numbering system using 0 for 1 BC

Astronomical year numbering is based on AD/CE year numbering, but follows normal decimal integer numbering more strictly. Thus, it has a year 0; the years before that are designated with negative numbers and the years after that are designated with positive numbers. Astronomers use the Julian calendar for years before 1582, including the year 0, and the Gregorian calendar for years after 1582, as exemplified by Jacques Cassini (1740), Simon Newcomb (1898) and Fred Espenak (2007).

The prefix AD and the suffixes CE, BC or BCE (Common Era, Before Christ or Before Common Era) are dropped. The year 1 BC/BCE is numbered 0, the year 2 BC is numbered −1, and in general the year n BC/BCE is numbered "−(n − 1)" (a negative number equal to 1 − n). The numbers of AD/CE years are not changed and are written with either no sign or a positive sign; thus in general n AD/CE is simply n or +n. For normal calculation a number zero is often needed, here most notably when calculating the number of years in a period that spans the epoch; the end years need only be subtracted from each other.

The system is so named due to its use in astronomy. Few other disciplines outside history deal with the time before year 1, some exceptions being dendrochronology, archaeology and geology, the latter two of which use 'years before the present'. Although the absolute numerical values of astronomical and historical years only differ by one before year 1, this difference is critical when calculating astronomical events like eclipses or planetary conjunctions to determine when historical events which mention them occurred.

== Usage of the year zero ==
In his Rudolphine Tables (1627), Johannes Kepler used a prototype of year zero which he labeled Christi (Christ's) between years labeled Ante Christum (Before Christ) and Post Christum (After Christ) on the mean motion tables for the Sun, Moon, Saturn, Jupiter, Mars, Venus and Mercury. In 1702, the French astronomer Philippe de la Hire used a year he labeled Christum 0 at the end of years labeled ante Christum (BC), and immediately before years labeled post Christum (AD) on the mean motion pages in his Tabulæ Astronomicæ, thus adding the designation 0 to Kepler's Christi. Finally, in 1740 the French astronomer Jacques Cassini (Cassini II), who is traditionally credited with the invention of year zero, completed the transition in his Tables astronomiques, simply labeling this year 0, which he placed at the end of Julian years labeled avant Jesus-Christ (before Jesus Christ or BC), and immediately before Julian years labeled après Jesus-Christ (after Jesus Christ or AD).

Cassini gave the following reasons for using a year 0:

The year 0 is that in which one supposes that Jesus Christ was born, which several chronologists mark 1 before the birth of Jesus Christ and which we marked 0, so that the sum of the years before and after Jesus Christ gives the interval which is between these years, and where numbers divisible by 4 mark the leap years as so many before or after Jesus Christ.

— Jacques Cassini

Fred Espenak of NASA lists 50 phases of the Moon within year 0, showing that it is a full year, not an instant in time. Jean Meeus gives the following explanation:

There is a disagreement between astronomers and historians about how to count the years preceding year 1. In [Astronomical Algorithms], the 'B.C.' years are counted astronomically. Thus, the year before the year +1 is the year zero, and the year preceding the latter is the year −1. The year which historians call 585 B.C. is actually the year −584. The astronomical counting of the negative years is the only one suitable for arithmetical purpose. For example, in the historical practice of counting, the rule of divisibility by 4 revealing Julian leap-years no longer exists; these years are, indeed, 1, 5, 9, 13, ... B.C. In the astronomical sequence, however, these leap-years are called 0, −4, −8, −12, ..., and the rule of divisibility by 4 subsists.

— Jean Meeus, Astronomical Algorithms

== Signed years without the year zero ==
Although he used the usual French terms "avant J.-C." (before Jesus Christ) and "après J.-C." (after Jesus Christ) to label years elsewhere in his book, the Byzantinist historian Venance Grumel (1890–1967) used negative years (identified by a minus sign, −) to label BC years and unsigned positive years to label AD years in a table. He may have done so to save space and he put no year 0 between them.

Version 1.0 of the XML Schema language, often used to describe data interchanged between computers in XML, includes built-in primitive datatypes date and dateTime. Although these are defined in terms of ISO 8601 which uses the proleptic Gregorian calendar and therefore should include a year 0, the XML Schema specification states that there is no year zero. Version 1.1 of the defining recommendation realigned the specification with ISO 8601 by including a year zero, despite the problems arising from the lack of backward compatibility.

== See also ==
- Julian day, another calendar commonly used by astronomers
- Astronomical chronology
- Holocene calendar
- ISO 8601
