= Proleptic Gregorian calendar =

Extension of the Gregorian calendar before its introduction

The proleptic Gregorian calendar extends the Gregorian calendar backward, proleptically, to dates before its 1582 introduction, creating a consistent dating system across history. For example, when U.S. President George Washington was born on 11 February 1731, Great Britain and its colonies still used the Julian calendar, also referred to as Old Style dating. When Britain finally adopted the Gregorian calendar in September 1752, Washington's birth date became 22 February 1732. During his life, both dates were observed and commemorated, but the latter is the one used and recognized since then.

== Usage ==
ISO 8601:2004 (clause 3.2.1 The Gregorian calendar) allows use of the proleptic Gregorian calendar for dates before its introduction only if the parties to the communication agree. Most scholars of the Maya civilization also use it, especially when converting Long Count dates (1st century BC – 10th century AD).

The best practice for citation of historically contemporary documents is to cite the date as expressed in the original text and to notate any contextual implications and conclusions regarding the calendar used and equivalents in other calendars. This practice permits others to re-evaluate the original evidence.

For these calendars one can distinguish two systems of numbering years BC. Bede and later historians did not enumerate any year as zero (nulla in Latin; see Year zero); therefore the year preceding AD 1 is 1 BC. In this system, the year 1 BC is a leap year (likewise in the proleptic Julian calendar). Mathematically, it is more convenient to include a year 0 and represent earlier years as negative numbers for the specific purpose of facilitating the calculation of the number of years between a negative (BC) year and a positive (AD) year. This is the convention in astronomical year numbering and the international standard date system, ISO 8601. In these systems, the year 0 is a leap year.

Although the nominal Julian calendar began in 45 BC, leap years between 45 BC and 1 BC were irregular. Thus the Julian calendar with quadrennial leap years was only used from the end of AD 4 until 1582 or later (contingent on the specific nation in question).

The proleptic Gregorian calendar is sometimes used in computer software to simplify identifying pre-Gregorian dates, e. g. in PostgreSQL, MySQL, SQLite, PHP, CIM, Delphi and Python.

== Julian calendar differences ==
Before the official and first introduction of the Gregorian calendar, the differences between Julian and proleptic Gregorian calendar dates are as follows:

The table below assumes a Julian leap day of 29 February, but the Julian leap day, that is, the bissextile day (ante diem bis sextum Kalendas Martias in Latin) was accomplished by repeating 24 February. Therefore, the dates between 24 and 29 February in all leap years were irregular.

Note: When converting a date in a year which is leap in the Julian calendar but not in the Gregorian, 29 February is included in the calculation when the conversion crosses the border of February and March.

Julian range	Proleptic Gregorian range	Gregorian ahead by
From 3 March AD 4 (beginning of quadrennial leap years) to 1 March 100	From 1 March AD 4 to 28 February 100	−2 days
From 2 March 100 to 29 February 200	From 1 March 100 to 28 February 200	−1 day
From 1 March 200 to 28 February 300	From 1 March 200 to 28 February 300	0 days
From 29 February 300 to 27 February 500	From 1 March 300 to 28 February 500	1 day
From 28 February 500 to 26 February 600	From 1 March 500 to 28 February 600	2 days
From 27 February 600 to 25 February 700	From 1 March 600 to 28 February 700	3 days
From 26 February 700 to 24 February 900	From 1 March 700 to 28 February 900	4 days
From 25 February 900 to 23 February 1000	From 1 March 900 to 28 February 1000	5 days
From 24 February 1000 to 22 February 1100	From 1 March 1000 to 28 February 1100	6 days
From 23 February 1100 to 21 February 1300	From 1 March 1100 to 28 February 1300	7 days
From 22 February 1300 to 20 February 1400	From 1 March 1300 to 28 February 1400	8 days
From 21 February 1400 to 19 February 1500	From 1 March 1400 to 28 February 1500	9 days
From 20 February 1500 to 4 October 1582	From 1 March 1500 to 14 October 1582	10 days
Julian range	Gregorian range	Difference
From 5 October 1582 to 18 February 1700	From 15 October 1582 to 28 February 1700	10 days
From 19 February 1700 to 17 February 1800	From 1 March 1700 to 28 February 1800	11 days
From 18 February 1800 to 16 February 1900	From 1 March 1800 to 28 February 1900	12 days
From 17 February 1900 to 15 February 1923	From 1 March 1900 to 28 February 1923	13 days
Orthodox Julian range	Gregorian range	Julian behind by
From 16 February 1923 to 14 February 2100	From 1 March 1923 to 28 February 2100	13 days

== See also ==
- Adoption of the Gregorian calendar by polity
- Proleptic Julian calendar
