= New Year =

Beginning of the calendar year

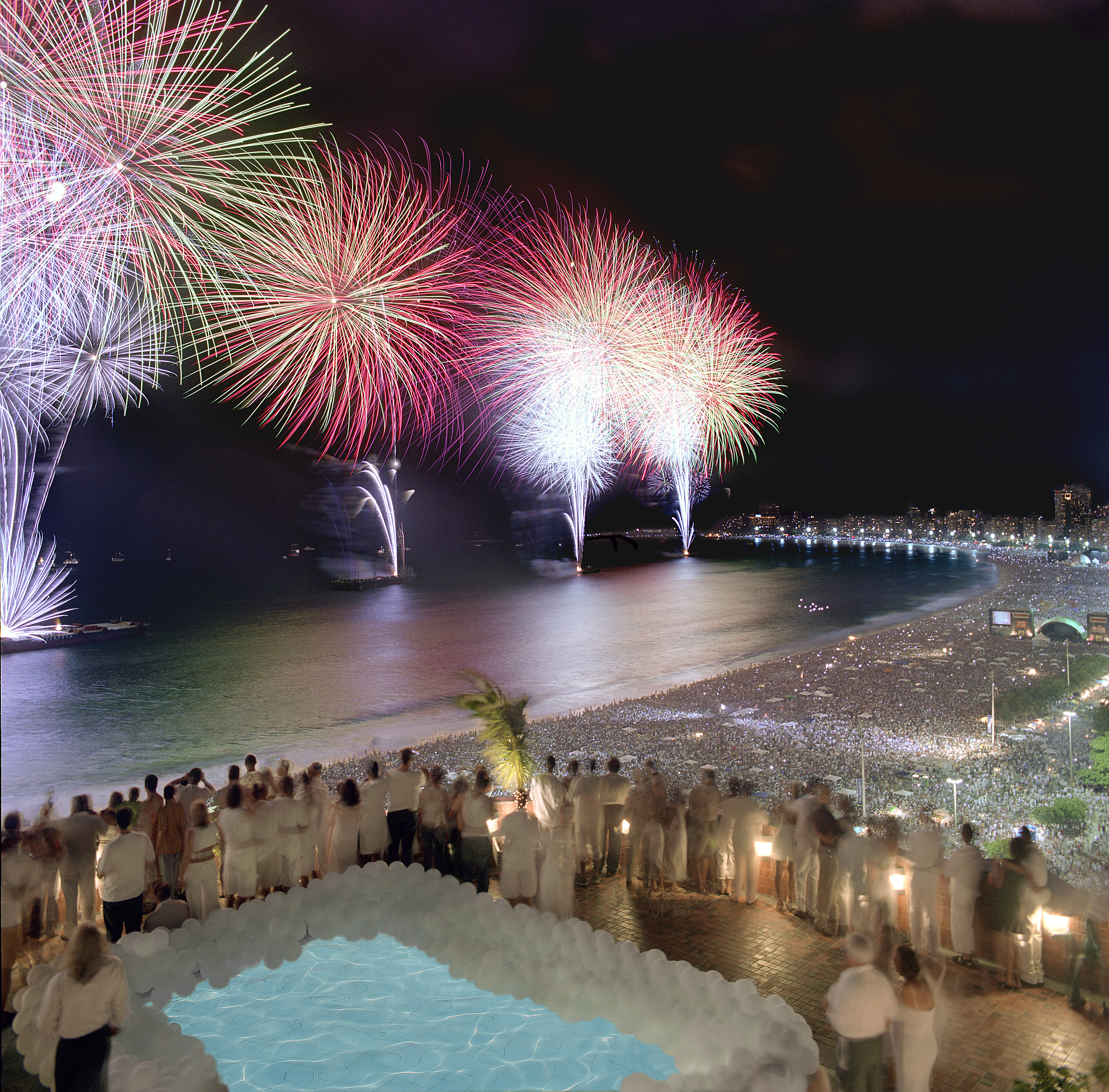
New Year's Eve celebration in Copacabana, Rio de Janeiro, Brazil (2004)

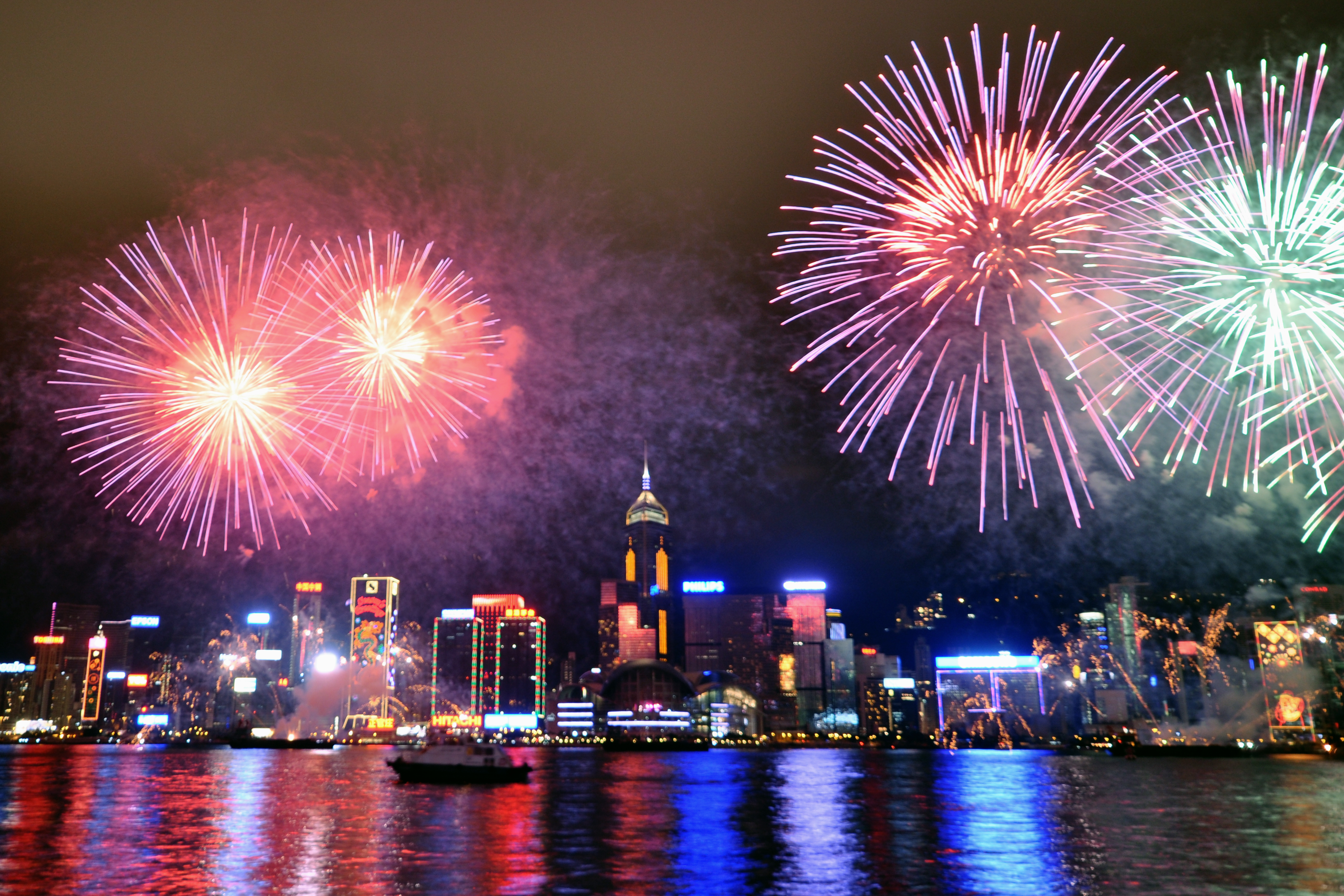
Chinese New Year celebration with fireworks display at Victoria Harbour in Hong Kong, 2012

The New Year is the time or day at which a new calendar year begins and the calendar's year count increments by one. Many cultures celebrate the event in some manner. In the Gregorian calendar, the most widely used calendar system today, New Year occurs on January 1 (New Year's Day, preceded by New Year's Eve). This was also the first day of the year in the original Julian calendar and the Roman calendar (after 153 BC).

Other cultures begin their traditional or religious year according to their own customs – typically (though not invariably) because they use a lunar calendar or a lunisolar calendar: the lunisolar Chinese calendar (and its variants), the lunar Islamic calendar and the lunisolar Hebrew calendar are among well-known examples. The Iranian calendar begins the year at the March equinox; the Ethiopian calendar begins in (Gregorian) September. India has many traditional calendars with a matching variety of first days. There are many more traditional calendars with associated start days: these are listed below.

During the Middle Ages in Western Europe, while the Julian calendar was still in use, authorities moved New Year's Day, depending upon locale, to one of several other days, including March 1, March 25, Easter, September 1, and December 25. Since then, many national civil calendars in the Western World and beyond have changed to using one fixed date for New Year's Day, January 1—most doing so when they adopted the Gregorian calendar.

== By type ==
Based on the used calendar new years are often categorized between lunar or lunisolar new years or solar new years.

== By month or season ==
=== January ===
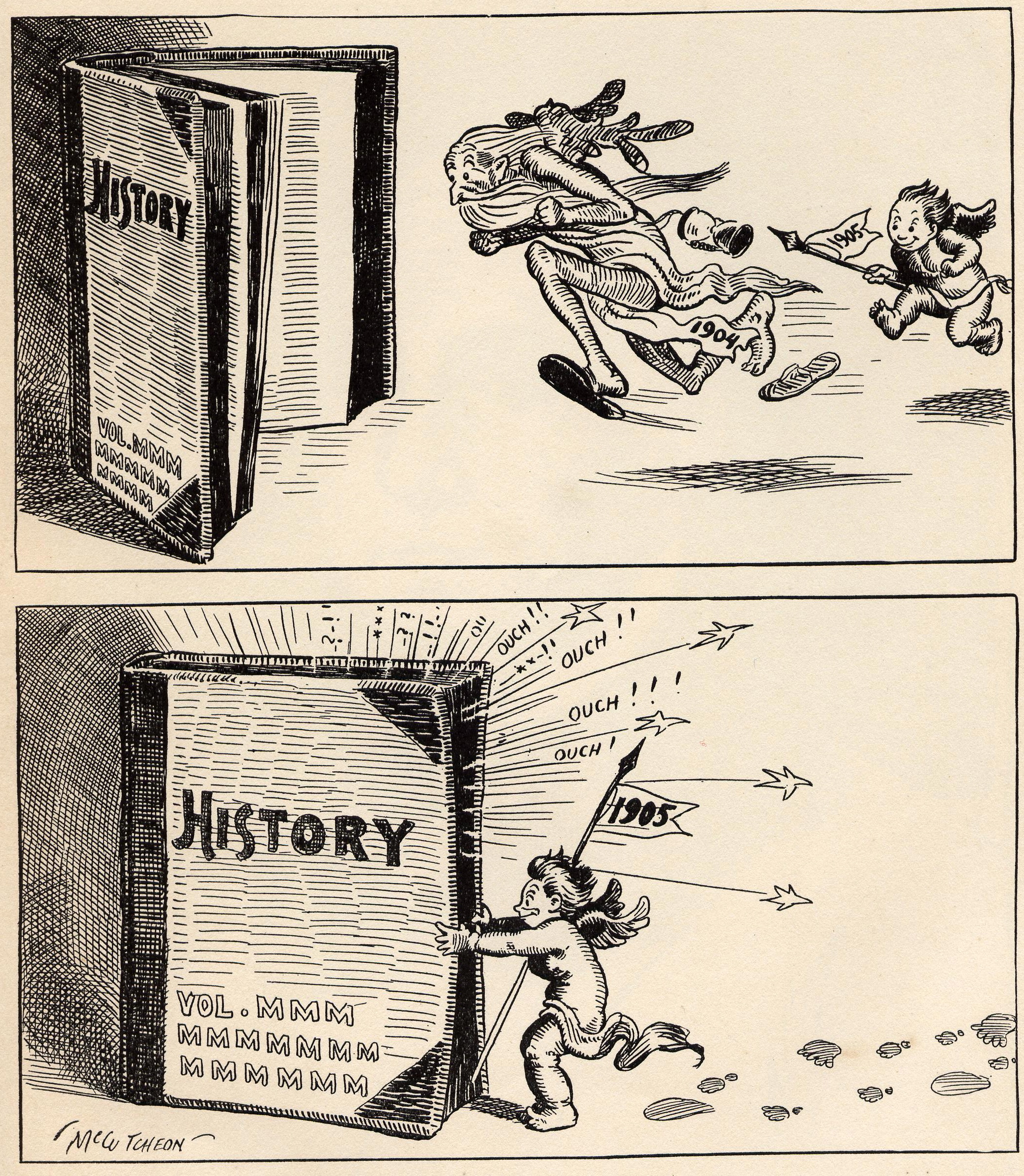
Baby New Year 1905 chases old 1904 into the history books in this cartoon by John T. McCutcheon.

- January 1: The first day of the civil year in the Gregorian calendar used by most countries.
  - Contrary to common belief in the west, the civil New Year of January 1 is not an Orthodox Christian religious holiday. The Eastern Orthodox liturgical calendar makes no provision for the observance of a New Year. January 1 is itself a religious holiday, but that is because it is the feast of the Circumcision of Jesus (seven days after his birth), and a commemoration of saints. While the liturgical calendar begins September 1, there is also no particular religious observance attached to the start of the new cycle. Orthodox nations may, however, make civil celebrations for the New Year. Those who adhere to the revised Julian calendar (which synchronizes dates with the Gregorian calendar), including Bulgaria, Cyprus, Egypt, Greece, Romania, Syria, Turkey and Ukraine, observe both the religious and civil holidays on January 1. In other nations and locations where Orthodox churches still adhere to the Julian calendar, including Georgia, Israel, Russia, North Macedonia, Serbia, Montenegro and Russian-occupied Ukraine, the civil new year is observed on January 1 of the civil calendar, while those same religious feasts occur on January 14 Gregorian (which is January 1 Julian), in accord with the liturgical calendar.
- The Japanese New Year (正月, Shōgatsu) is currently celebrated on January 1, with the holiday usually being observed until January 3, while other sources say that Shōgatsu lasts until January 6. In 1873, five years after the Meiji Restoration, Japan adopted the Gregorian calendar. Prior to 1873, Japan used a lunar calendar with twelve months each of 29 or 30 days for a total year of about 354 days.
- The Sámi celebrated Ođđajagemánnu.

=== Winter lunisolar new years ===
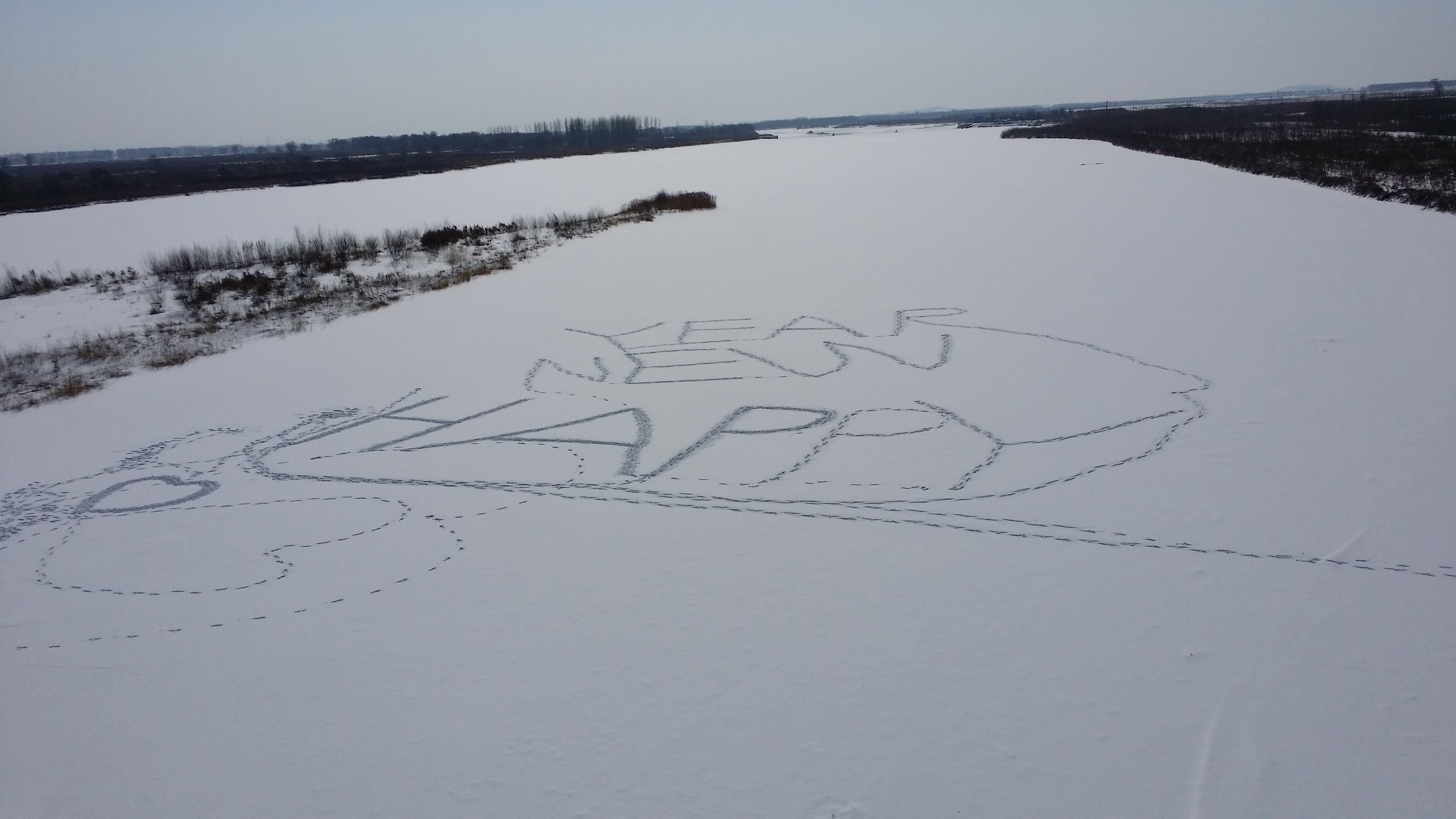
A Happy New Year sign in northeastern China

Lunisolar calendars count months according to lunations but, because there are not an even number of lunar cycles in a solar year, the calendar must be restarted annually on the first, second or even third new moon after the winter solstice. (The term "lunar calendar" is often used of lunisolar calendars, but true lunar calendars (such as the Islamic calendar) count only lunations and ignore the solar seasons.)

- The Chinese New Year, also known as Spring Festival or Lunar New Year, occurs every year on the new moon of the first lunar month, about the beginning of spring (Lichun). The exact date can fall any time between January 21 and February 21 (inclusive) of the Gregorian Calendar. Traditionally, years were marked by one of twelve Earthly Branches, represented by an animal, and one of ten Heavenly Stems, which correspond to the five elements. This combination cycles every 60 years. It is the most important Chinese celebration of the year.
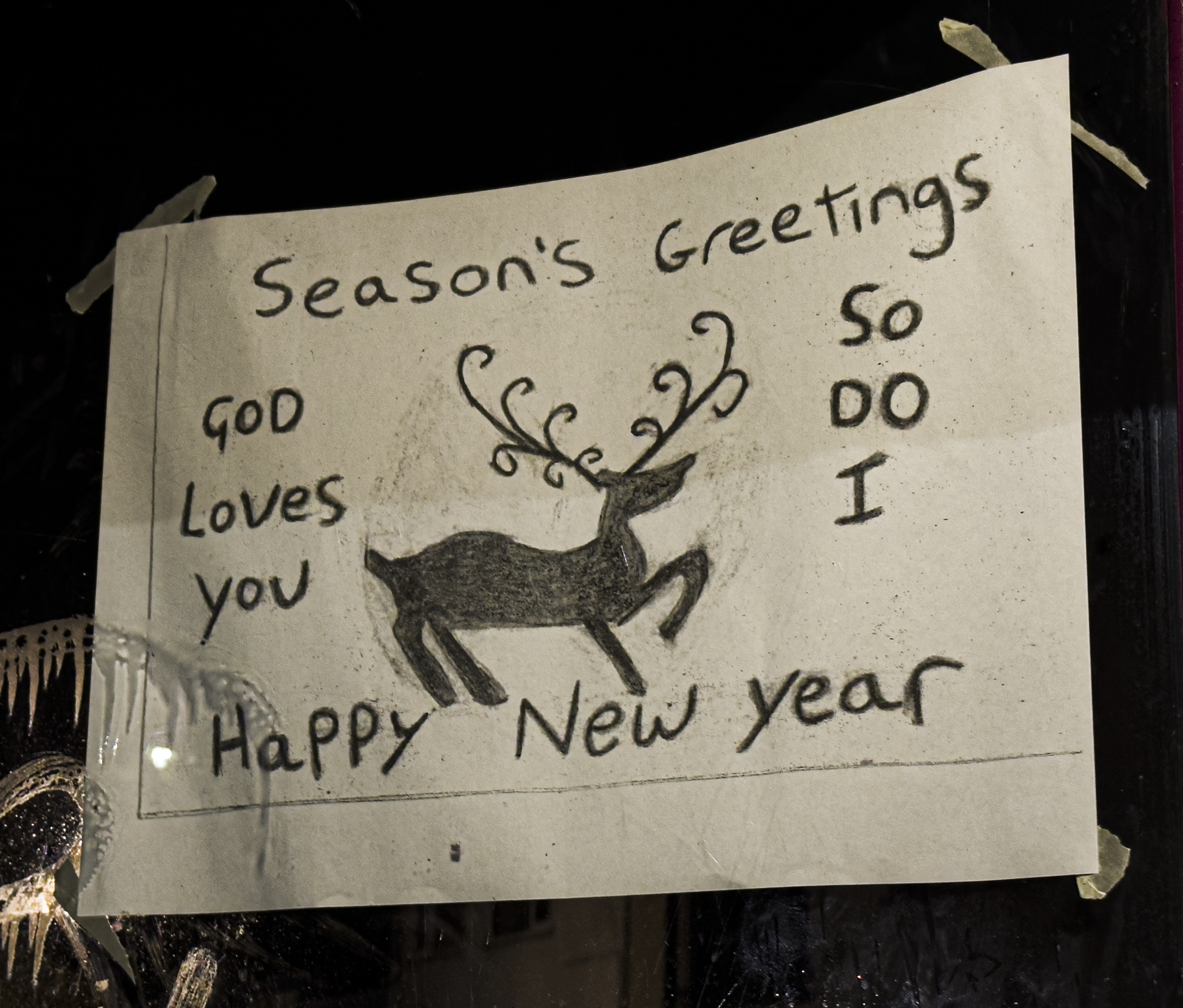
- A Happy New Year sign in the United Kingdom
  The Korean New Year is a Seollal or Lunar New Year's Day. Although January 1 is, in fact, the first day of the year, Seollal, the first day of the lunar calendar, is more meaningful for Koreans. A celebration of the Lunar New Year is believed to have started to let in good luck and ward off bad spirits all throughout the year. With the old year out and a new one in, people gather at home and sit around with their families and relatives, catching up on what they have been doing.
- The Vietnamese New Year is the Tết Nguyên Đán which most times is the same day as the Chinese New Year due to the Vietnamese using a lunisolar calendar similar to the Chinese calendar.
- The Tibetan New Year is Losar and falls between January and March.
- The Taiwanese New Year is called Kuè-nî and falls between January and March.

=== March ===
- Babylonian New Year began with the first New Moon after the northward equinox. Ancient celebrations lasted for eleven days.
- Nava Varsha is celebrated in India in various regions from March–April.
- The Iranian New Year, called Nowruz, is the day containing the exact moment of the Northward equinox, which usually occurs on March 20 or 21, marking the start of the spring season. The Zoroastrian New Year coincides with the Iranian New Year of Nowruz and is celebrated by the Parsis in India and by Zoroastrians and Persians across the world. In the Baháʼí calendar, the new year occurs on the vernal equinox on March 20 or 21 and is called Naw-Rúz. The Iranian tradition was also passed on to Central Asian countries, including Kazakhs, Uzbeks, and Uighurs, and there is known as Nauryz. It is usually celebrated on March 22.
- The Balinese New Year, based on the Saka Calendar (Balinese-Javanese Calendar), is called Nyepi, and it falls on Bali's Lunar New Year (around March). It is a day of silence, fasting, and meditation: observed from 6 am until 6 am the next morning, Nyepi is a day reserved for self-reflection and as such, anything that might interfere with that purpose is restricted. Although Nyepi is a primarily Hindu holiday, non-Hindu residents of Bali observe the day of silence as well, out of respect for their fellow citizens. Even tourists are not exempt; although free to do as they wish inside their hotels, no one is allowed onto the beaches or streets, and the only airport in Bali remains closed for the entire day. The only exceptions granted are for emergency vehicles carrying those with life-threatening conditions and women about to give birth.
- Ugadi (Telugu: ఉగాది, Kannada: ಯುಗಾದಿ); the Telugu and Kannada New Year, generally falls in the months of March or April. The people of Andhra Pradesh, Telangana and Karnataka states in southern India celebrate the advent of New Year's Day in these months. The first month of the new year is Chaitra Masa.
- In the Kashmiri calendar, the holiday Navreh marks the New Year in March–April. This holy day of Kashmiri Brahmins has been celebrated for several millennia.
- Gudi Padwa is celebrated as the first day of the Hindu year by the people of Maharashtra, India and Sanskar Padwa is celebrated in Goa. This day falls in March–April and coincides with Ugadi. (see: Deccan)
- The Sindhi festival of Cheti Chand is celebrated on the same day as Ugadi/Gudi Padwa to mark the celebration of the Sindhi New Year.
- The Thelemic New Year on March 20 (or on April 8 by some accounts) is usually celebrated with an invocation to Ra-Hoor-Khuit, commemorating the beginning of the New Aeon in 1904. It also marks the start of the twenty-two-day Thelemic holy season, which ends on the third day of the writing of The Book of the Law. This date is also known as The Feast of the Supreme Ritual. There are some that believe the Thelemic New Year falls on either March 19, 20, or 21, depending on the vernal equinox, which is The Feast for the Equinox of the Gods on the vernal equinox of each year to commemorate the founding of Thelema in 1904. In 1904 the vernal equinox was on March 21, and it was the day after Aleister Crowley ended his Horus Invocation that brought on the new Æon and Thelemic New Year.
- From 1155 until 1752, the civil year in England and its possessions began on March 25 (see below.)

=== April ===
- The Assyrian-Babylonian New Year, called Kha b'Nissan or Resha d'Sheeta, occurs on April 1.
- Thelemic New Year Celebrations usually end on April 10, after an approximately one-month-long period that begins on March 20 (the formal New Year). This one-month period is referred to by many as the High Holy Days, and end with periods of observance on April 8, 9, and 10, coinciding with the three days of the Writing of the Book of the Law by Aleister Crowley in 1904.

=== Mid-April (Spring in the Northern Hemisphere) ===
The new year of many South and Southeast Asian calendars falls between April 13–15, marking the beginning of spring.

- The Baloch Hindu people in Pakistan and India celebrate their new year called Bege Roch in the month of Daardans according to their Saaldar calendar.
- Tamil New Year (Tamil: தமிழ்புத்தாண்டு Puthandu) is celebrated in the South Indian state of Tamil Nadu, on the first of Chithrai (சித்திரை) (April 13, 14, or 15). In the temple city of Madurai, the Chithrai Thiruvizha is celebrated in the Meenakshi Temple. A huge exhibition is also held, called Chithrai Porutkaatchi. In some parts of Southern Tamil Nadu, it is also called Chithrai Vishu. The day is marked with a feast in Hindu homes and the entrance to the houses are decorated elaborately with kolams.
- Punjabi/Sikh Vaisakhi (ਵਿਸਾਖੀ) is celebrated on April 14 in Punjab according to their nanakshahi calendar.
- Nepal New Year in Nepal is celebrated on the 1st of Baisakh Baisākh which falls on 12–15 April in the Gregorian calendar. Nepal follows the Bikram Sambat (BS) as an official calendar.
- The Dogra of Himachal Pradesh celebrate their new year Chaitti in the month of Chaitra.
- Maithili New Year or Jude-Sheetal too fall on these days. It is celebrated by Maithili People all around the world.
- Assamese New Year (Rongali Bihu or Bohag Bihu) is celebrated on April 14 or 15 in the Indian state of Assam.
- Bengali New Year (Bengali: পহেলা বৈশাখ Pôhela Boishakh or Bengali: বাংলা নববর্ষ Bangla Nôbobôrsho) is celebrated on the 1st of Boishakh (April 14 or 15) in Bangladesh and the Indian states of West Bengal, Tripura, Barak Valley of Assam, Jharkhand and Andaman and Nicobar Islands.
- Odia New Year (Vishuva Sankranti) is celebrated on April 14 in the Indian state of Odisha. It is also called Vishuva Sankranti or Pana Sankranti (ପଣା ସଂକ୍ରାନ୍ତି).
- Manipuri New Year or Cheirouba is celebrated on April 14 in the Indian State of Manipur with much festivities and feasting.
- Sinhalese New Year is celebrated with the harvest festival (in the month of Bak) when the sun moves from the Meena Rashiya (House of Pisces) to the Mesha Rashiya (House of Aries). Sri Lankans begin celebrating their National New Year "Aluth Avurudda (අලුත් අවුරුද්ද)" in Sinhala and "Puththandu (புத்தாண்டு)" in Tamil. However, unlike the usual practice where the new year begins at midnight, the National New Year begins at the time determined by the astrologers by calculating the exact time that sun goes from Meena Rashiya (House of Pisces) to the Mesha Rashiya (House of Aries). Not only the beginning of the new year but the conclusion of the old year is also specified by the astrologers. And unlike the customary ending and beginning of the new year, there is a period of a few hours in between the conclusion of the Old Year and the commencement of the New Year, which is called the "nona gathe" (neutral period) Where part of the sun in House of Pisces and Part is in House of Aries.
- Malayali New Year (Malayalam: വിഷു, Vishu) is celebrated in the South Indian state of Kerala in mid-April.
- Western parts of Karnataka where Tulu is spoken, the new year is celebrated along with Tamil/ Malayali New year April 14 or 15, although in other parts most commonly celebrated on the day of Gudi Padwa, the Maharashtrian new year. In Kodagu, in Southwestern Karnataka, however, both new year, Yugadi (corresponding to Gudi Padwa in March) and Bisu (corresponding to Vishu in around April 14 or 15), are observed.
- The Water Festival is the form of similar new year celebrations taking place in many Southeast Asian countries, on the day of the full moon of the 11th month on the lunisolar calendar each year. The date of the festival is based on the traditional lunisolar calendar which determines the dates of Buddhist festivals and holidays, and is observed from April 13 to 15. Traditionally people gently sprinkled water on one another as a sign of respect, but since the new year falls during the hottest month in Southeast Asia, many people end up dousing strangers and passersby in vehicles in boisterous celebration. The festival has many different names specific to each country:
  - In Burma it is known as Thingyan (Burmese: သင်္ကြန်, MLCTS: sangkran)
  - Songkran (Thai: สงกรานต์) in Thailand
  - Pi Mai Lao (Lao: ສົງກຣານ Songkan) in Laos
  - Chaul Chnam Thmey (Khmer: បុណ្យចូលឆ្នាំថ្មី ) in Cambodia.
  - It is also the traditional new year of the Dai peoples of Yunnan Province, China. Religious activities in the tradition of Theravada Buddhism are also carried out, a tradition in which all of these cultures share.

=== June ===
- The New Year of the Kutchi people occurs on Ashadi Beej, that is 2nd day of Shukla paksha of Aashaadha month of Hindu calendar. As for people of Kutch, this day is associated with the beginning of rains in Kutch, which is largely a desert area. Hindu calendar month of Aashaadh usually begins on June 22 and ending on July 22.
- Odunde Festival is a celebration on the 2nd Sunday of June, where "Odunde" means "Happy New Year" in the Yorube Nigerian language.
- The Xooy ceremony of the Serer people of Senegal, Gambia and Mauritania marks the Serer New Year.
- In the Dogon religion, the Bulo festival marks the Dogon New Year.

=== July ===
- The New Year of the Zulu people occurs on the full moon of July.

=== September ===
- Neyrouz, the Coptic New Year, is the continuation of the ancient Egyptian New Year following the Roman emperor Augustus's reform of its calendar. Its date of Thoth 1 usually occurs on August 29 in the Julian calendar, except in the year before a Julian leap year, when it occurs the next day. The leap years removed from the Gregorian calendar mean that it presently falls on September 11 or 12 but on different days before 1900 or after 2100.
- Enkutatash, the Ethiopian New Year, occurs on the same day as Neyrouz.
- The New Year of the French Revolutionary Calendar, in force from 1793 to 1805 and briefly under the Paris Commune in 1871, occurred on the Southward equinox (22, 23, or 24 September)

=== Autumn in the Northern Hemisphere ===
- Rosh Hashanah (Hebrew for 'head of the year') is a Jewish, two day holiday, commemorating the culmination of the seven days of Creation, and marking God's yearly renewal of His world. The day has elements of festivity and introspection, as God is traditionally believed to be assessing His creation and determining the fate of all men and creatures for the coming year. In Jewish tradition, honey is used to symbolize a sweet new year. At the traditional meal for that holiday, apple slices are dipped in honey and eaten with blessings recited for a good, sweet new year. Some Rosh Hashanah greetings show honey and an apple, symbolizing the feast. In some congregations, small straws of honey are given out to usher in the new year.
- The Pathans Kalasha celebrate their Chowmus which marks the beginning of their year in Chitral district of Pakistan and parts of India.
- The Marwari New Year (Thapna) is celebrated on the day of the festival of Diwali, which is the last day Krishna Paksha of the Ashvin month & also the last day of the Ashvin month of the Hindu calendar.
- The Gujarati New Year (Bestu/Nao Varas) is celebrated the day after the festival of Diwali (which occurs in mid-fall – either October or November, depending on the Lunar calendar). The Gujarati New Year is synonymous with sud ekam, i.e. first day of Shukla paksha of the Kartik month, which is taken as the first day of the first month of the Gujarati lunar calendar. Most other Hindus celebrate the New Year in early spring. The Gujarati community all over the world celebrates the New Year after Diwali to mark the beginning of a new fiscal year.
- The Sikkimese celebrate their new year called Losar.
- The Nepal Era New year (see Nepal Sambat) is celebrated in regions encompassing original Nepal. The new year occurs on the fourth day of Diwali. The calendar was used as an official calendar until the mid-19th century. However, the new year is still celebrated by the Newars community of Nepal.
- Some neo-pagans celebrate their interpretation of Samhain (a festival of the ancient Celts, held around November 1) as a New Year's Day representing the new cycle of the Wheel of the Year, although they do not use a different calendar that starts on this day.

=== December ===
- The Mizo in northeast India celebrate their Pawl Kut in December.
- The Inuit, the Aleut, the Yupik, the Chukchi and the Iñupiat celebrate Quviasukvik (Inuktitut: ᖁᕕᐊᓲᑎᖃᕐᕕᒃ) as their New Year. It occurs on the same day as Christmas Eve.

=== Variable ===
F15
Opening of the Year
Wpt Rnpt
in hieroglyphs

- The Islamic New Year occurs on Muharram. Since the Islamic calendar is based on 12 lunar months amounting to about 354 days, its New Year occurs about eleven days earlier each year in relation to the Gregorian calendar, with two Islamic New Years falling in the Gregorian year 2008.
- Satu Suro is the Javanese New Year, which falls on the first day of the month of Suro and corresponds with the first Islamic month of Muharram. Most Javanese in Java, Indonesia celebrated it by staying at home and refrain leaving the house.
- The "Opening of the Year" (Ancient Egyptian: Wp(t) Rnpt; Arabic: افتتاح العام Aiftitah al-Eam), usually transcribed as Wep Renpet, was the ancient Egyptian New Year. It appears to have originally been set to occur upon Sirius's return to the night sky (July 19 proleptic Julian calendar), during the initial stages of former annual flood of the Nile. However the Egyptian calendar's lack of leap years, until its reform by the Roman emperor Augustus, meant that the celebration slowly cycled through the entire solar year over the course of two or three 1460-year Sothic cycles.

== Christian liturgical year ==
The early development of the Christian liturgical year coincided with the Roman Empire (east and west), and later the Byzantine Empire, both of which employed a taxation system labeled the Indiction, the years for which began on September 1. This timing may account for the ancient church's establishment of September 1 as the beginning of the liturgical year, despite the official Roman New Year's Day of January 1 in the Julian calendar, because the Indiction was the principal means for counting years in the empires, apart from the reigns of the Emperors. The September 1 date prevailed throughout all of Christendom for many centuries, until subsequent divisions eventually produced revisions in some places.

After the sack of Rome in 410, communications and travel between east and west deteriorated. Liturgical developments in Rome and Constantinople did not always match, although a rigid adherence to form was never mandated in the church. Nevertheless, the principal points of development were maintained between east and west. The Roman and Constantinopolitan liturgical calendars remained compatible even after the East-West Schism in 1054. Separations between the Catholic General Roman Calendar and Eastern Orthodox liturgical calendar grew only over several centuries' time. During those intervening centuries, the Latin Church Catholic ecclesiastic year was moved to the first day of Advent, the Sunday nearest to St. Andrew's Day (November 30). The Anglican church used Annunciation Style dating (in which the year begins on 25 March): the civil and ecclesiastical calendar of England and the British Dominions operated this convention until the Calendar (New Style) Act 1750 took effect in 1752.

The present-day Eastern Orthodox liturgical calendar is the virtual culmination of the ancient eastern development cycle, though it includes later additions based on subsequent history and lives of saints. It still begins on September 1, proceeding annually into the Nativity of the Theotokos (September 8) and Exaltation of the Cross (September 14) to the celebration of Nativity of Christ (Christmas), through his death and resurrection (Pascha/Easter), to his Ascension and the Dormition of the Theotokos ("falling asleep" of the Virgin Mary, August 15). This last feast is known in the Roman Catholic church as the Assumption. The dating of "September 1" is according to either the "new" Revised Julian calendar or the "old" (traditional) Julian calendar, depending on which is used by a particular Orthodox Church. The new calendar coincides with the (Gregorian) civil calendar; September 1 old style equates to September 14 new style (between 1900 and 2099 inclusive) on the civil calendar.

The liturgical calendars of the Coptic and Ethiopian Orthodox churches are unrelated to these systems but instead follow the Alexandrian calendar which fixed the wandering ancient Egyptian calendar to the Julian year. Their New Year celebrations on Neyrouz and Enkutatash were fixed; however, at a point in the Sothic cycle close to the Indiction; between the years 1900 and 2100, they fall on September 11 (Gregorian) during most years and September 12 in the years preceding a leap year.

== Historical European new year dates ==
During the Roman Republic and the Roman Empire, years began on the date on which each consul first entered the office. This was probably May 1 before 222 BC, March 15 from 222 BC to 154 BC, and January 1 from 153 BC. In 45 BC, when Julius Caesar's new Julian calendar took effect, the Senate fixed January 1 as the first day of the year. At that time, this was the date on which those who were to hold civil office assumed their official position, and it was also the traditional annual date for the convening of the Roman Senate. This civil new year remained in effect throughout the Roman Empire, east and west, during its lifetime and well after, wherever the Julian calendar continued in use.

In the Middle Ages in Europe a number of significant feast days in the ecclesiastical calendar of the Roman Catholic Church came to be used as the beginning of the Julian year:

- In Modern Style or Circumcision Style dating, the new year begins on January 1, the Feast of the Circumcision of Christ.
- In Annunciation Style or Lady Day Style the new year began on March 25, the feast of the Annunciation (traditionally nicknamed Lady Day). This date, representing the Incarnation of Christ, was used in many parts of Europe during the Middle Ages and beyond, variously following two distinct interpretations:
  - Counting from 25 March, 1 BC. Representing the conception of Christ nine months before Christmas, this interpretation first appeared in Arles at the end of the 9th century then spread to Burgundy and northern Italy. It was not commonly used and was called calculus pisanus, 'the Pisan calculation', since it was adopted in Pisa and survived there until 1750.
  - Counting from 25 March, AD 1. This interpretation, likely favoured for its convenience, may have originated in Fleury Abbey in the early 11th century, but it was spread by the Cistercians. Florence adopted that style in opposition to that of Pisa, acquiring the name calculus florentinus, 'the Florentine calculation'. It soon spread in France, and also in England where it became common in the late 12th century and remained in use until 1752.
- In Easter Style dating, the new year began on Holy Saturday (the day before Easter), or sometimes on Good Friday. As Easter is a movable feast the same date could occur twice in a year; the two occurrences were distinguished as "before Easter" and "after Easter". Primarily a French custom (mos gallicanus), it was introduced in France by king Philip II (r. 1180–1223), perhaps to establish a new style in the provinces reconquered from England. It was never uniformly adopted and did not spread far beyond the ruling élite and their familial and economic connections.
- In Christmas Style or Nativity Style, the new year began on December 25, the feast of the Nativity. It had been popularised by Bede together with anno Domini in the early Middle Ages. This style was used in most of western Europe except Spain, including France and England until the 12th century, and in the Holy Roman Empire until the second quarter of the 13th century.

Over the centuries, countries changed between styles until the Modern Style (January 1) prevailed. In Great Britain, for example:

- In England, either Annunciation Style (March 25) or Nativity Style (December 25th) was used until the Norman Conquest in 1066, when Modern Style (January 1) was adopted; but Annunciation Style was used again from 1155 until 1752.
- Scotland changed from Annunciation Style (March 25) to Modern Style with effect from January 1, 1600 (by Order of the King's Privy Council on December 17, 1599).

Despite the unification of the Scottish and English royal crowns with the accession of King James VI and I in 1603, and even the union of the kingdoms themselves in 1707, England continued to use Annunciation Style for its civil calendar while Scotland used Modern Style. This led to the act being recorded at the time in England as 6 March 1706 (rather than 1707), because in England (unlike Scotland) it fell before the new year began (on 25 March). Even in England, the Modern Style became customary, leading to the common practice of dual dating events in the first quarter of the year.

The final change came when Parliament passed the Calendar (New Style) Act 1750. This act had two major elements: it converted all parts of the British Empire to use of the Gregorian calendar and simultaneously it declared the civil new year in England, Wales, Ireland and the Colonies to be January 1 (as was already the case in Scotland). It went into effect on 3 September (Old Style) or 14 September (New Style) 1752.

A more unusual case is France, which observed the Northern autumn equinox day (usually September 22) as "New Year's Day" in the French Republican Calendar, which was in use from 1793 to 1805. This was primidi Vendémiaire, the first day of the first month.

== Adoptions of January 1 ==
It took quite a long time before January 1 again became the universal or standard start of the civil year. The years of adoption of January 1 as the new year are as follows:

Country	Start year
Holy Roman Empire (~Germany)	1544
Spain, Portugal, Poland	1556
Prussia, Denmark, and Sweden	1559
France (Edict of Roussillon)	1564
Southern Netherlands	1576
Lorraine	1579
Dutch Republic	1583
Scotland	1600
Russia	1700 (Note: A 1725 date given in some sources probably originates from Bond (1875) (p. 101) but is not correct, as the 1699 Ukase № 1736 (20 December 1699 [O.S.] (30 December [N.S.]) promulgating it attests.)
Tuscany	1721
England and Wales, Ireland and British Empire (Note: Calendar (New Style) Act 1750)	1752
Japan	1873
Republic of China	1912
Greece	1923
Turkey	1926
Thailand	1941

March 1 was the first day of the numbered year in the Republic of Venice until its destruction in 1797, and in Russia from 988 until 1492 (Anno Mundi 7000 in the Byzantine calendar). September 1 was used in Russia from 1492 (A.M. 7000) until the adoption of both the Anno Domini notation and 1 January as New Year's Day, with effect from 1700, via December 1699 decrees (1735, 1736) of Tsar Peter I.

== See also ==
- Baby New Year – Personification of the New Year
- List of films set around New Year
- New Year's Eve – Last day of the Gregorian year
- Old Style and New Style dates – Changes in calendar conventions
- Twelve Grapes – Spanish New Year tradition

=== New Year celebrations ===
- Assyrian New Year, also known as Kha b-Nisan – Assyrian New Year
- Aztec New Year – New year celebration per the Aztec calendar
- Berber New Year, also known as Yennayer – First month of the Berber year
- Cambodian New Year – Traditional Cambodian holiday
- Chinese New Year – Traditional Chinese holiday
- Ethiopian New Year, also known as Enkutatash – Ethiopian and Eritrean New Year holiday
- Hogmanay – Scottish celebration of New Year
- Hobiyee – Nisga'a new year
- Indian New Year's days – New Year's Days in India
- Islamic New Year – Beginning of a new lunar Hijri year
- Japanese New Year – Traditional holiday
- Jewish New Year – Jewish New Year
- Korean New Year – Traditional Korean holiday
- Lunar New Year – Beginning of a year in a lunar calendar
- Māori New Year – Māori new year festival
- Mongolian New Year – First day of the year according to the Mongolian lunar calendar
- Nogbon – Ossetian New Year
- Old New Year, also known as Orthodox New Year, Julian New Year – Informal traditional holiday based on the Julian calendar
- Pohela Boishakh – Bengali new year
- Pakistani New Year – Religious festival in Sikhism and Hinduism
- Persian New Year – New Year's Day on the Iranian calendars
- Russian New Year – New Year celebrations in post-Soviet countries
- Sinhalese New Year – Sri Lankan new year holiday
- Thai New Year – Traditional Thai New Year's holiday
- Vietnamese New Year, also known as Tết – Vietnamese New Year celebration

== Sources ==
- Bond, John James (1875), Handy-book of rules and tables, London: George Bell & Sons - see pages xvii–xviii
