= Hindu New Year =

Hindu New Year may refer to:

- Hindu Lunar New Year: Chaitra Navaratri or Navarati (March–April)
- Hindu Solar New Year: Mesha Sankranti (April–May)
- Hindu Financial New Year: Kartika Shukla Pratipada (October–November)

== See also ==
- Indian New Year's days
- South and Southeast Asian solar New Year
