= Sedudo Waterfall =

- Coban Sedudo
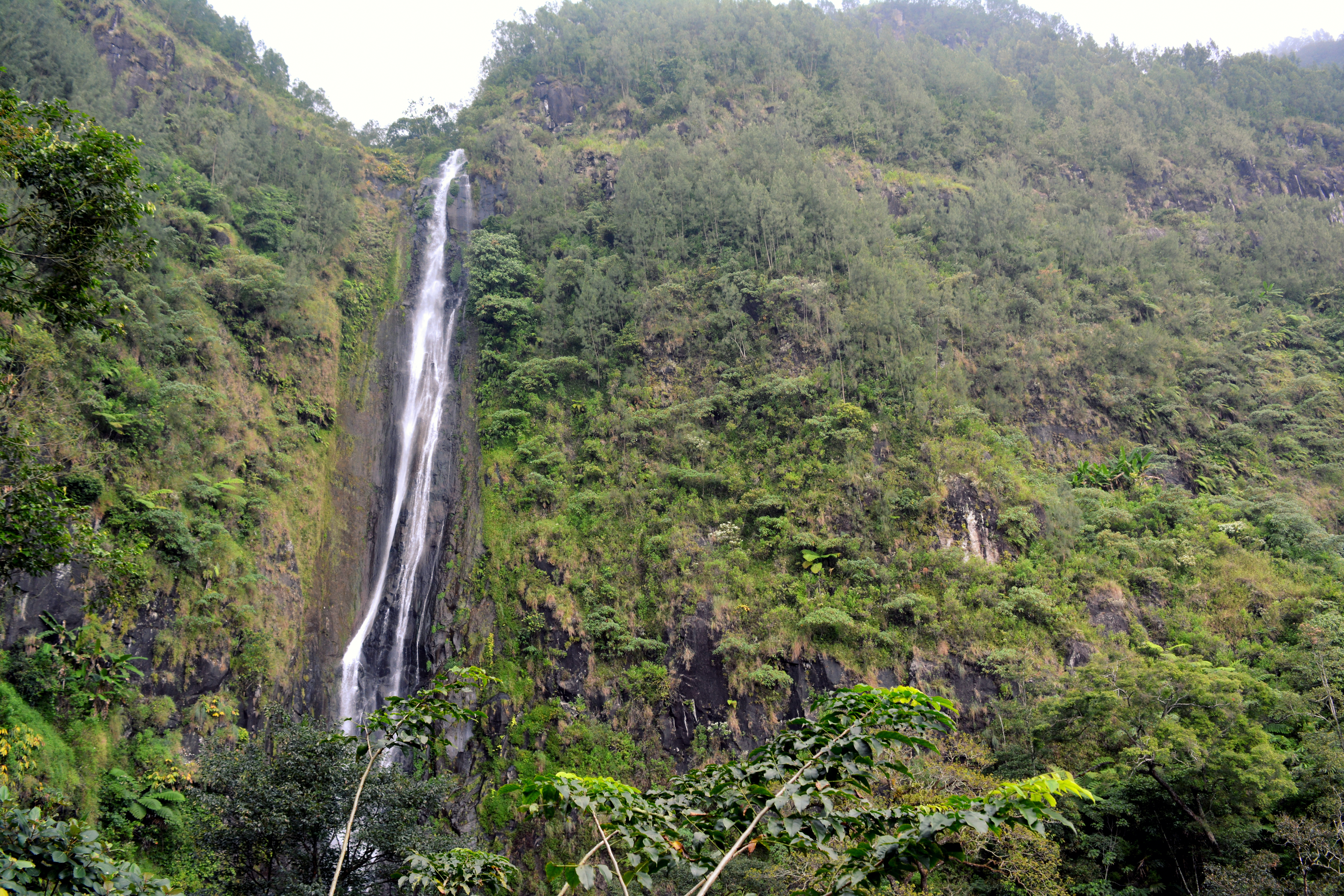
- Interactive map of Sedudo Waterfall
- Location: Nganjuk Regency, East Java, Indonesia
- Coordinates: 7°46′49″S 111°45′29″E
- Type: Plunge
- Total height: 105 metres (344 ft)
- Watercourse: Sedudo River

Sedudo waterfall is situated in the Ngliman village, Sawahan district, within Nganjuk Regency, East Java, Indonesia. The waterfall is located some 30 km south of the district’s capital, Nganjuk, and lies at an altitude of 1,438 metres above sea level, with a drop of approximately 105 metres. Sedudo is close to the base of Mount Wilis, a volcanic massif with no recorded history of eruptions.

== Tourist attraction and infrastructure ==
Sedudo waterfall is a local tourist attraction and plays a significant role in the festivities and rituals of Sato Sura – the start of the Javanese New Year that celebrated during the month known as Sura, sometimes written as Suro.

The local government in Nganjuk Regency has constructed a pool at the base of the waterfall and a surrounding paved area for visitors and onlookers. A small fee of 3,000 Rupiah per person is charged to enter the area around the waterfall. Transport from Surabaya and Yogyakarta has been improved to make visiting the waterfall easier.

In February 2023 there was cliff collapse at the waterfall site which caused one fatality and three injuries. A rotten tree and rocks fell from the edge of the top of the waterfall striking people when it fell.

== Sedudo bathing ritual ==
According to the local custom, bathing in the Sedudo waterfall on the first day of Sato Sura will ensure salvation and eternal youth. There are two ways of receiving this blessing. Many locals bathe in the pool at the base of the waterfall or under the waterfall itself. This practice is commonly observed during Sato Sura, when thousands of people from the Nganjuk Regency come to visit the Sedudo waterfall. At other times during the year it is common to bathe a Parna Prahista statue or icon in the waters, and to take the water that has touched the artifact back home, to sprinkle on members of the family. The bathing custom and ritual statue ceremony have been part of East Javanese culture since the empire of Majapahit (1293 – c.1500).

== See also ==
- List of waterfalls
