= Opening of the Year =

Ancient Egyptian festival

The Opening of the Year Festival (wpy-rnp.t), also called the Beginning of the Year (tpy-rnp.t), Coming out of Sothis (pr.t-spd.t), the Birth of the King, and the Birth of Re (msw.t-Rꜥ), was an Egyptian festival celebrating the beginning of the year on the first of Thout. It was in correspondence with the Inundation of the Nile. The different titles were associated with different annual or semi-annual moments that fell on the same date, and possibly with different calendrical systems.

Sopdet was associated with this holiday as the goddess of the Sirius star, as were flood goddesses such as Anuket, Satis (who was also associated with Sirius), and the goddess Isis. As Sopdet didn't have a specific cult, the celebration of the festival (as it coincided with the reappearance of the star Sirius) could be considered secular.

== Old Kingdom ==
The festival is attested in the Sahure and Nasuerre calendars from the Old Kingdom.

The regnal year was started at the New Year in the Old Kingdom.

== Middle Kingdom ==
The association with the New Year and the celebration of the rising of Sopdet appears solidly for the first time in the Middle Kingdom. However, it is possible this is referenced in ivory carvings from the First Dynasty in the Old Kingdom.

The regnal year started at the New Year in the Middle Kingdom.

Record from around the time of Senusret I's reign indicate a nighttime fire lighting ritual was done on the New Year, and on the fifth intercalary day (functionally, New Year's Eve).

== New Kingdom ==
By the Ramesside period, the term "Birth of Re (msw.t-Rꜥ)" became preferred over "Opening of the Year (wpy-rnp.t)". Beginning of the year (tpy-rnp.t), was not always used calendrically, and seems to sometimes translate to "annual". The term front of eternity (ḥꜣ.t nḥḥ) was also associated with the New Year (as well as other dates connected to royal accessions), and may have been a poetic way of wishing the king more years in his reign.

At least the first three days of the year were public holidays due to Opening of the Year festivities, though more are sometimes recorded. The festivities seem to have typically lasted nine days in the New Kingdom, starting on the day before the intercalary days.

Fire and torch lighting to keep away malicious spirits were common practices in this era, and ritual combat took place during a water procession on a temple lake.

== Ptolemaic and Roman Period ==
In the Ptolemaic and Roman periods, this involved the procession of statues held entirely within the temple. It was a national, not regional festival, celebrated in all temples, though regional specificities were noted. The statue would be carried out from the chamber where it was kept most of the time, where it was quite dark, and brought out into halls and courts with increasing amounts of sunlight. It went onto the roof, where the Opening of the Mouth ritual was performed. This and the exposure to sun was a form of spiritual revitalization.

Alongside dedication to Ra, an inscription on the Calendar of Hathor of Dendera at the temple of Edfu proclaimed the festival to be a tribute to all goddesses.

In the Ptolemaic and Roman periods, the New Year festivities often lasted four, five, or nine days, sometimes with a festival day marked on the last day before the intercalary days.

The ‘uniting of the sun-disk’ (hmn itn), is recorded by Ptolemaic-Roman sources as an essential part of the New Year Feast, but there is only indirect evidence of the practice in the New Kingdom.

It is theorized that a class of artifacts, handled bowls with relief carvings depicting Horus (sometimes in the form of Harpocrates), Isis, or Serapis, and often showing lotuses, grapes, and wreaths, made of dark stone, were ritual objects used during the new year. The dark color may have been evoking Nile soil, and the circular shape and lotuses may have been evoking the sun. Grapes were associated with rebirth and Osiris, whose rebirth was associated with the Inundation. The wreath may have been referencing Osiris, the crown of justification, and the wreath given to gods in this era representing triumph over enemies. Isis's mourning of Osiris was seen as causing the Inundation with her tears, and associated her with Sothis, the star that rises in connection with the Inundation. The Inundation was regarded as a smaller scale repetition of the creation of the world.

In the Roman period, the festival was also called The Day of the Opening of the Seasons (hrw n wn tr.w), the Feast of Eternity (ḥb nḥḥ), and the Feast of Everlastingness (ḥb ḏ.t).

It has been alleged that this festival influenced the New Year Festival held at Mankunduchi in Zanzibar, called Naoruz or Siku ya Mwaka. Others claim this festival has a more direct Persian influence.

Solid evidence of the festival being a celebration of Sopdet really comes in the Ptolemaic period, though there are earlier references. In this period, the reference to Sirius as the "dog star" influenced the depiction of Sopdet, but otherwise does not seem to have remained in descendants of this festival, such as Coptic Nayrouz or Wafaa El-Nil (the Flooding of the Nile)

== In Modernity ==
The term "the Birth of Re (msw.t-Rꜥ)" etymologically became "Mesore", the Coptic month before the intercalary days that come before Thout.

The Opening of the Year Festival occurs on the same day as Nayrouz, and Enkutatash, the first of Thout/Meskerem.
