= Nogbon =

Ossetian New Year

Nogbon or the Ossetian New Year is a new year festival celebrated by Ossetians and the "master of the New Year" in Ossetian mythology. It is celebrated annually between 12 and 14 of January.

The common customs/rituals of the festival are serving a traditional festive pie called "artkhuron" which symbolizes the sun, dancing around the fire and jumping over the fire to eliminate "last year's adversity".

== See also ==
- Nowruz
