= Walford Dakin Selby =

English archivist and antiquary

Walford Dakin Selby (1845–1889) was an English archivist and antiquary.

== Life ==
Born on 16 June 1845, he was the eldest son of Thomas Selby of Whitley and Wimbush Hall, Essex, by his wife Elizabeth, youngest daughter and coheiress of Ralph Foster of Holderness, Yorkshire. He was educated at Brighton College, and Tunbridge School. After leaving school he was placed with a Dr. Stromberg in Bonn, to learn German and French.

In 1867 Selby became a junior clerk in the Public Record Office, where he ultimately became superintendent of the search-room. In 1883, with his friend James Greenstreet, he founded the Pipe Roll Society, of which he was director-in-chief, and honorary treasurer for the rest of his life.

Selby cut his own throat while suffering from typhoid fever, dying at his residence, 9 Clyde Street, Redcliffe Gardens, London S.W., on 3 August 1889. He was buried on 8 August in Kensal Green cemetery.

== Works ==
Selby compiled The Jubilee Date Book (1887), and edited:

- Bond's Book of Dates, 1875. New edition of a work of John James Bond.
- Lancashire and Cheshire Records, 2 pts. 1882–3.
- Norfolk Records, 1886; with Walter Rye.

At the time of his death he was preparing:

- a new edition of the Red Book of the Exchequer, completed by Hubert Hall, and subsequently criticised, particularly by J. H. Round;
- an edition of Queen Elizabeth I's manuscript translation of De Consolatione Philosophiæ by Boethius; and
- a new index to the Inquisitiones post mortem.

From 1884 to April 1889 Selby edited The Genealogist. He was a contributor on literary subjects to The Athenæum, The Academy, The Antiquary, Antiquarian Magazine, and other periodicals. His papers on The Robbery of Chaucer at Hatcham, and Chaucer as Forrester of North Petherton, in the County of Somerset, were published as Nos. 1 and 3 in the Life-Records of Chaucer, which Selby edited for the Chaucer Society, 1875 et seqq.

== Family ==
Selby once put forward a claim to the dormant peerage of Viscount Montagu. He abandoned it, not being able to prove beyond dispute a marriage on which the claim rested.

== Notes ==
Attribution

This article incorporates text from a publication now in the public domain: Lee, Sidney, ed. (1897). "Selby, Walford Dakin". Dictionary of National Biography. Vol. 51. London: Smith, Elder & Co.
