= Lunar New Year =

Beginning of a year in a lunar calendar

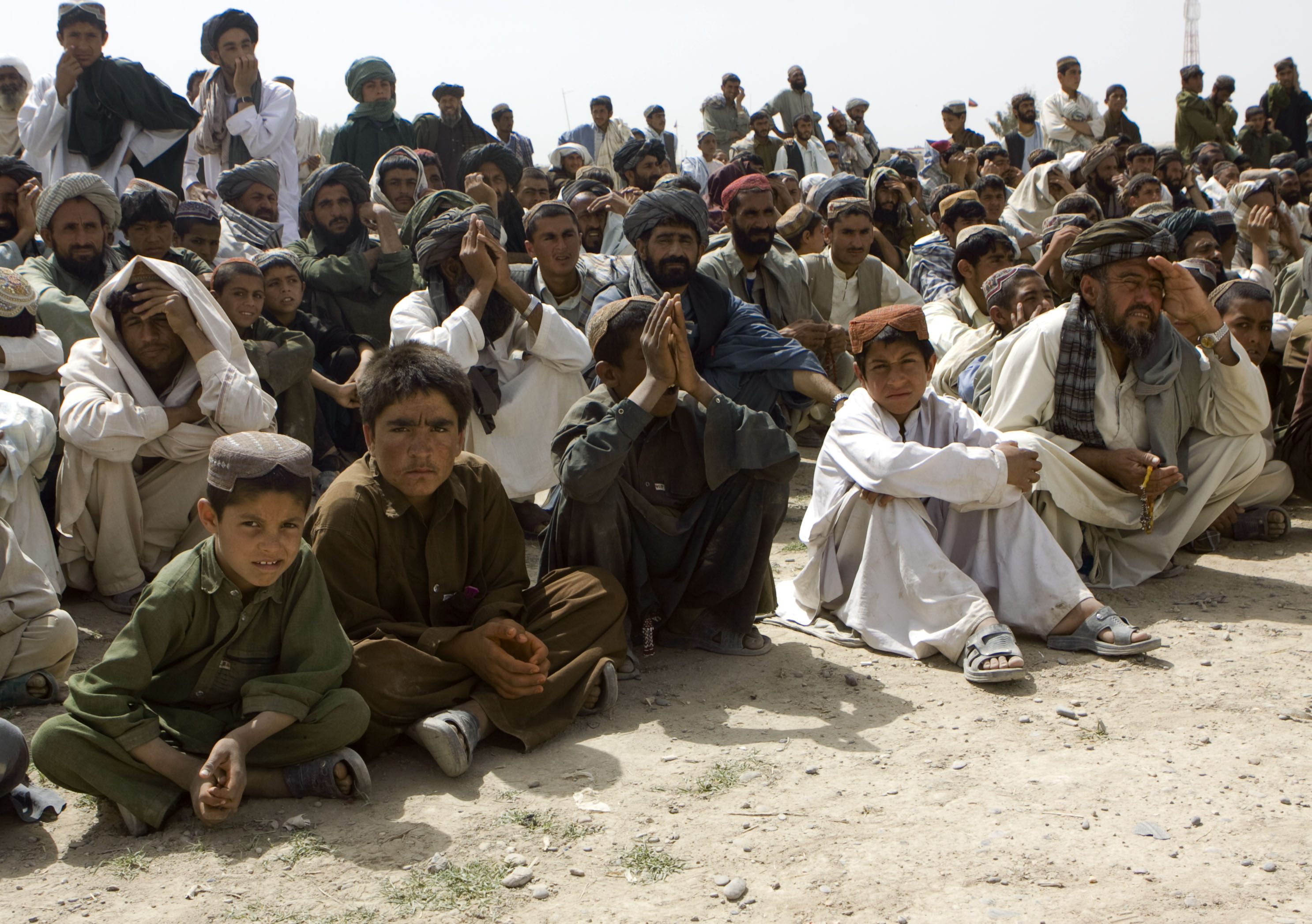
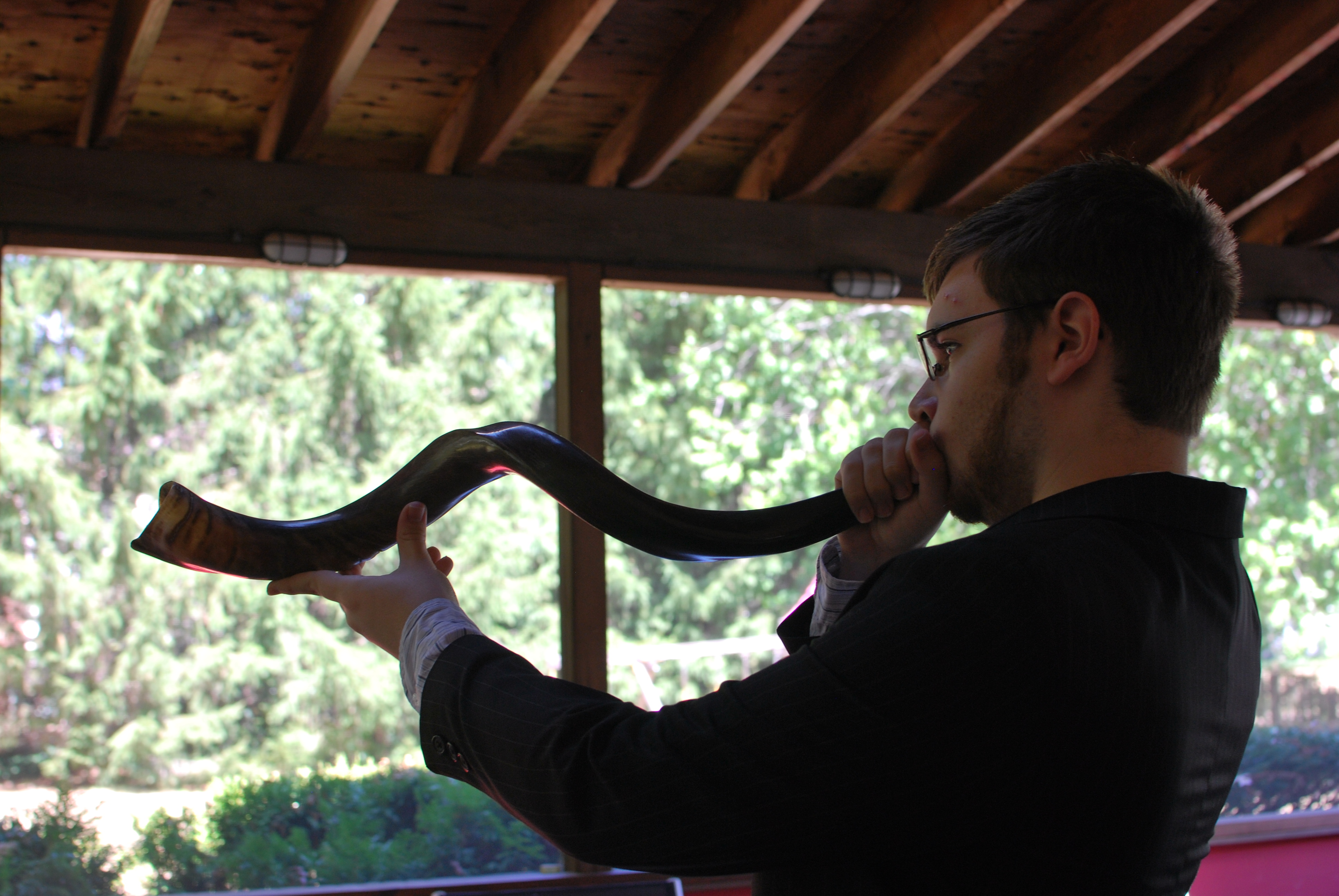
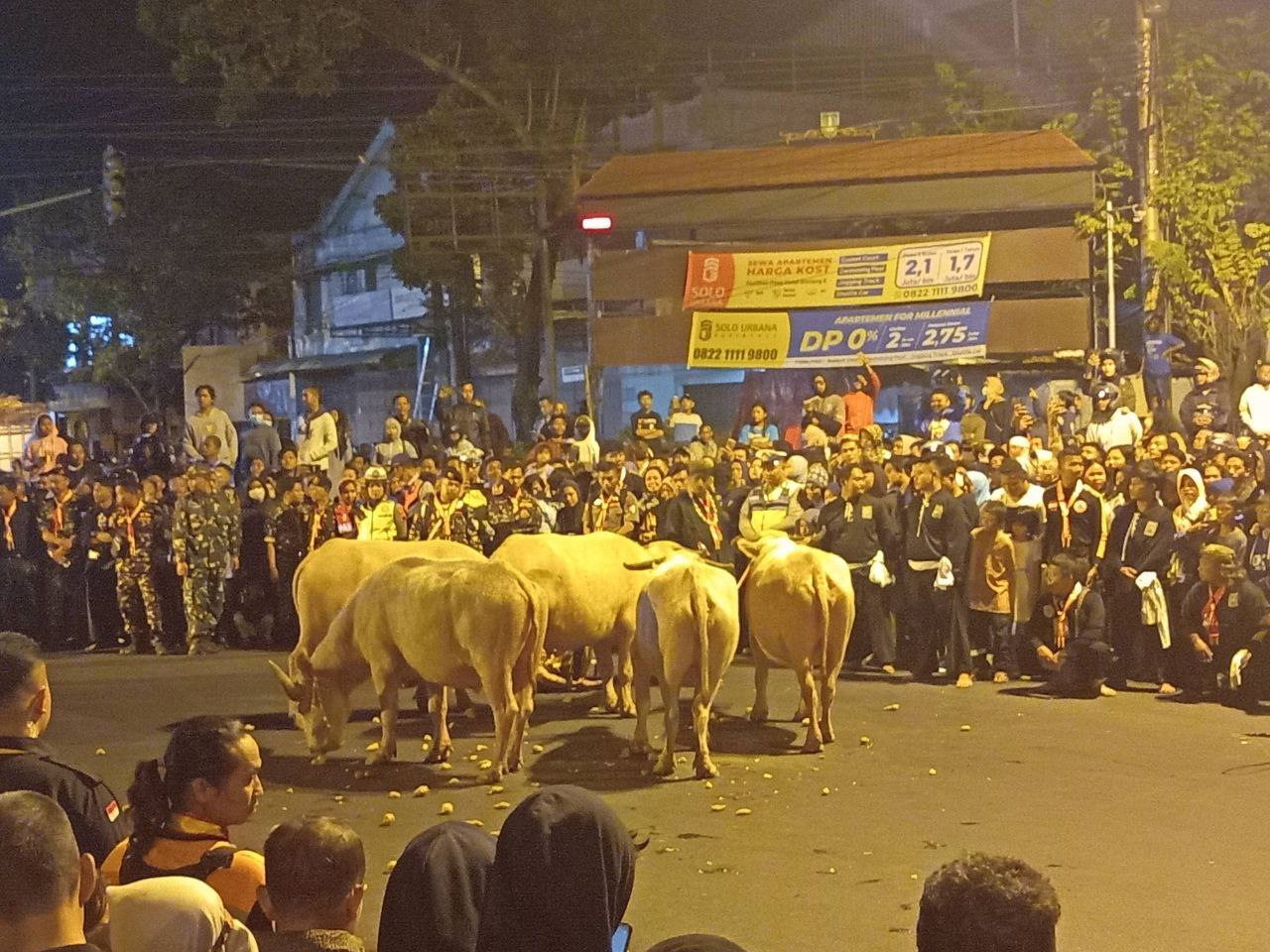
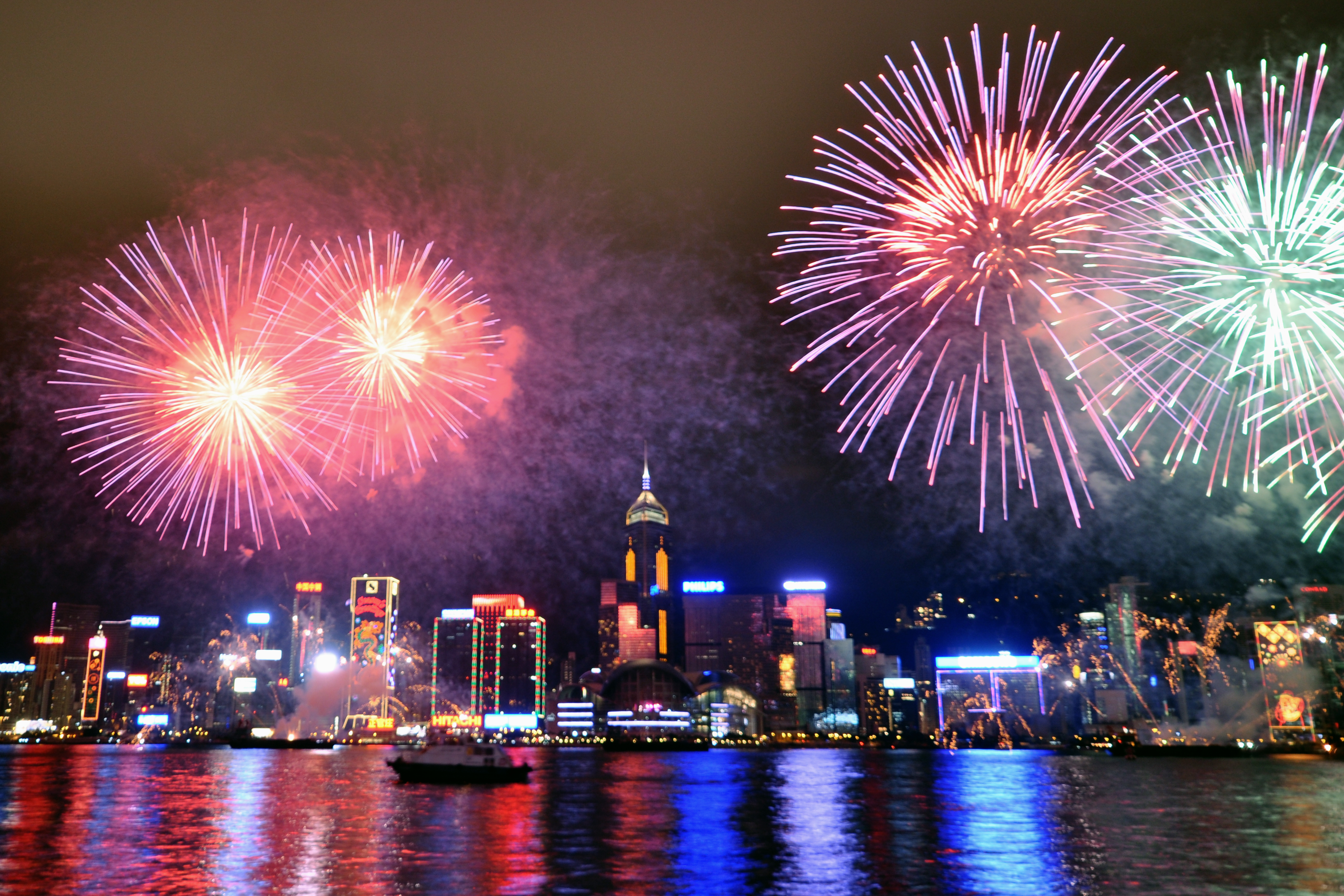
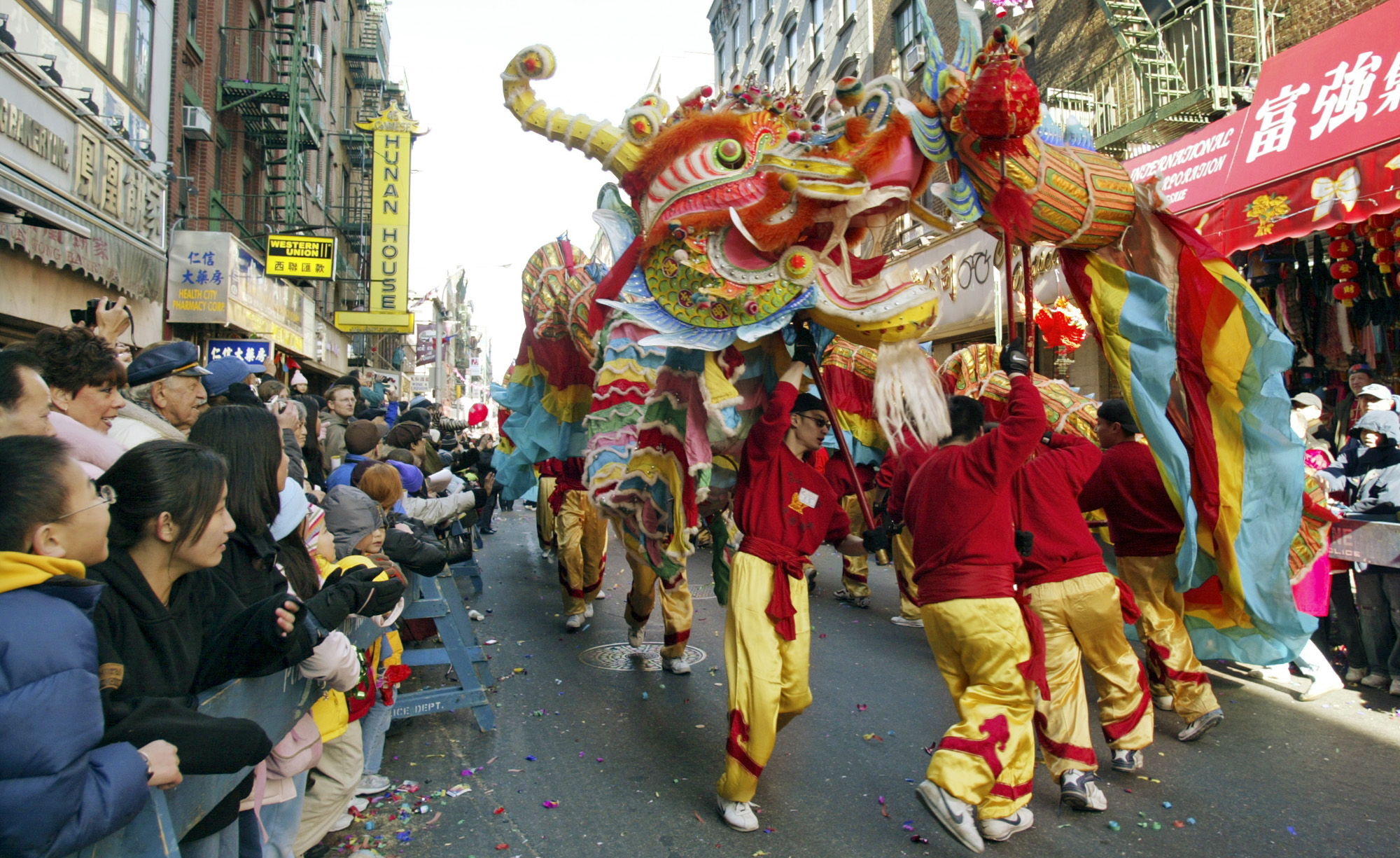
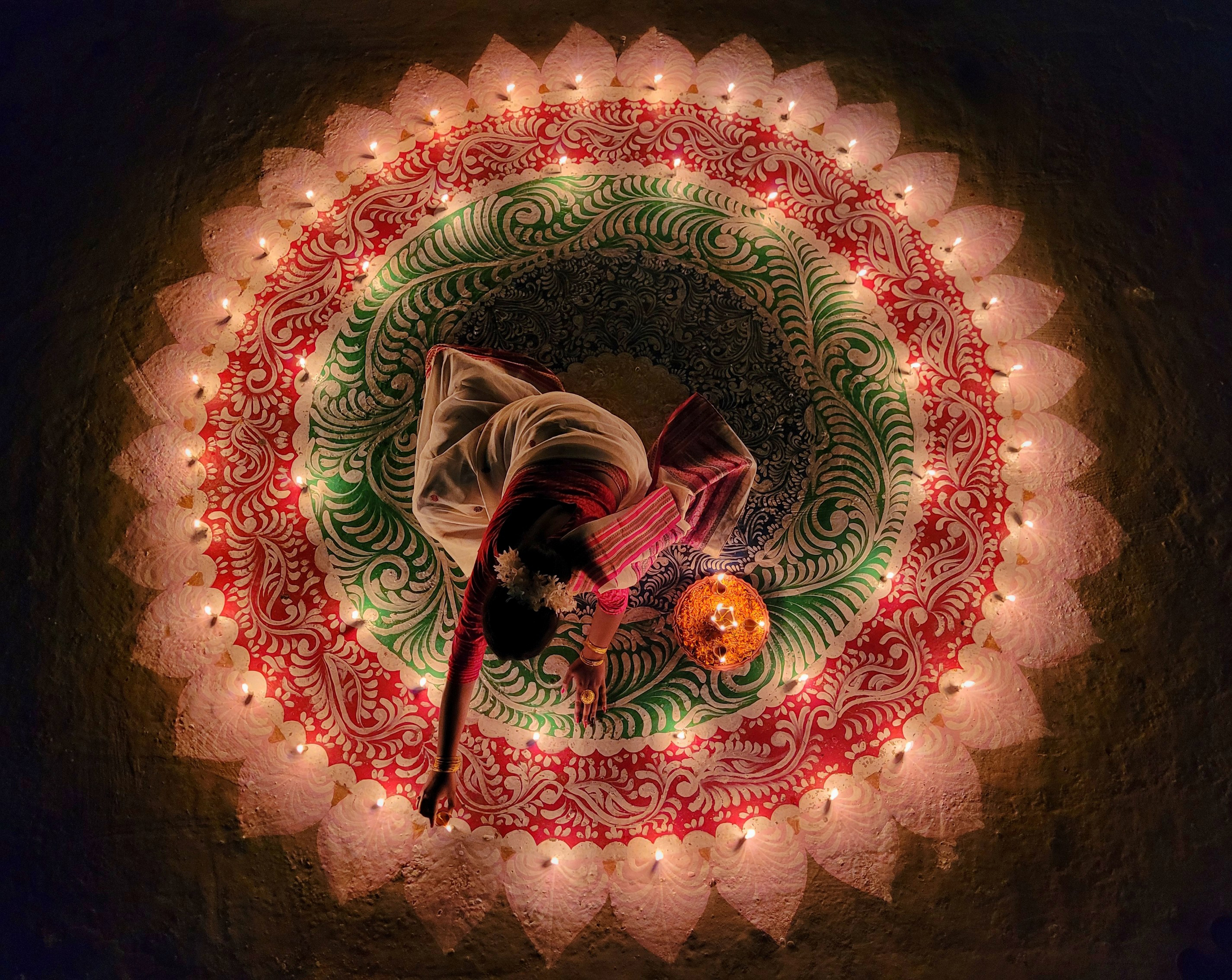
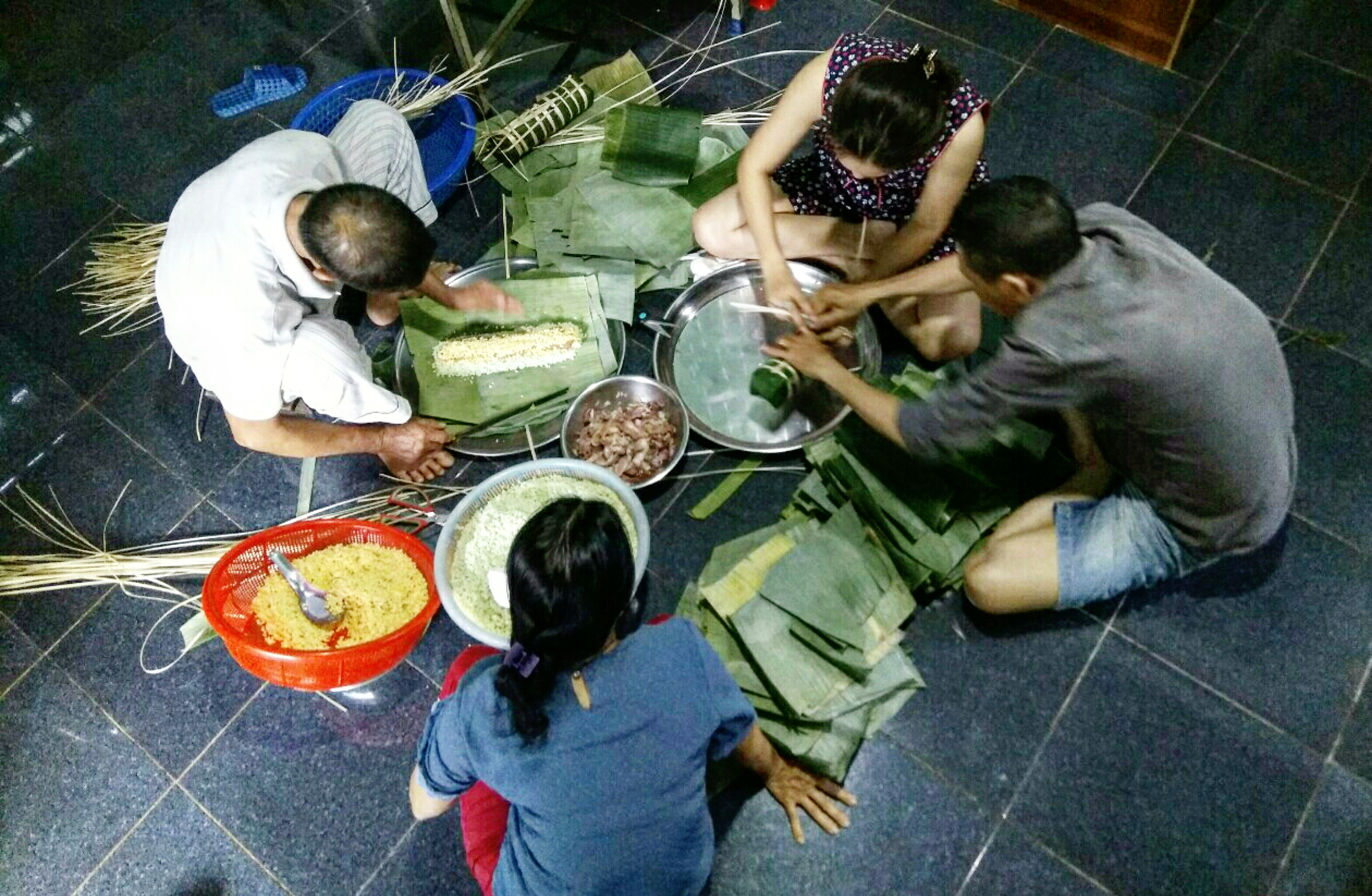
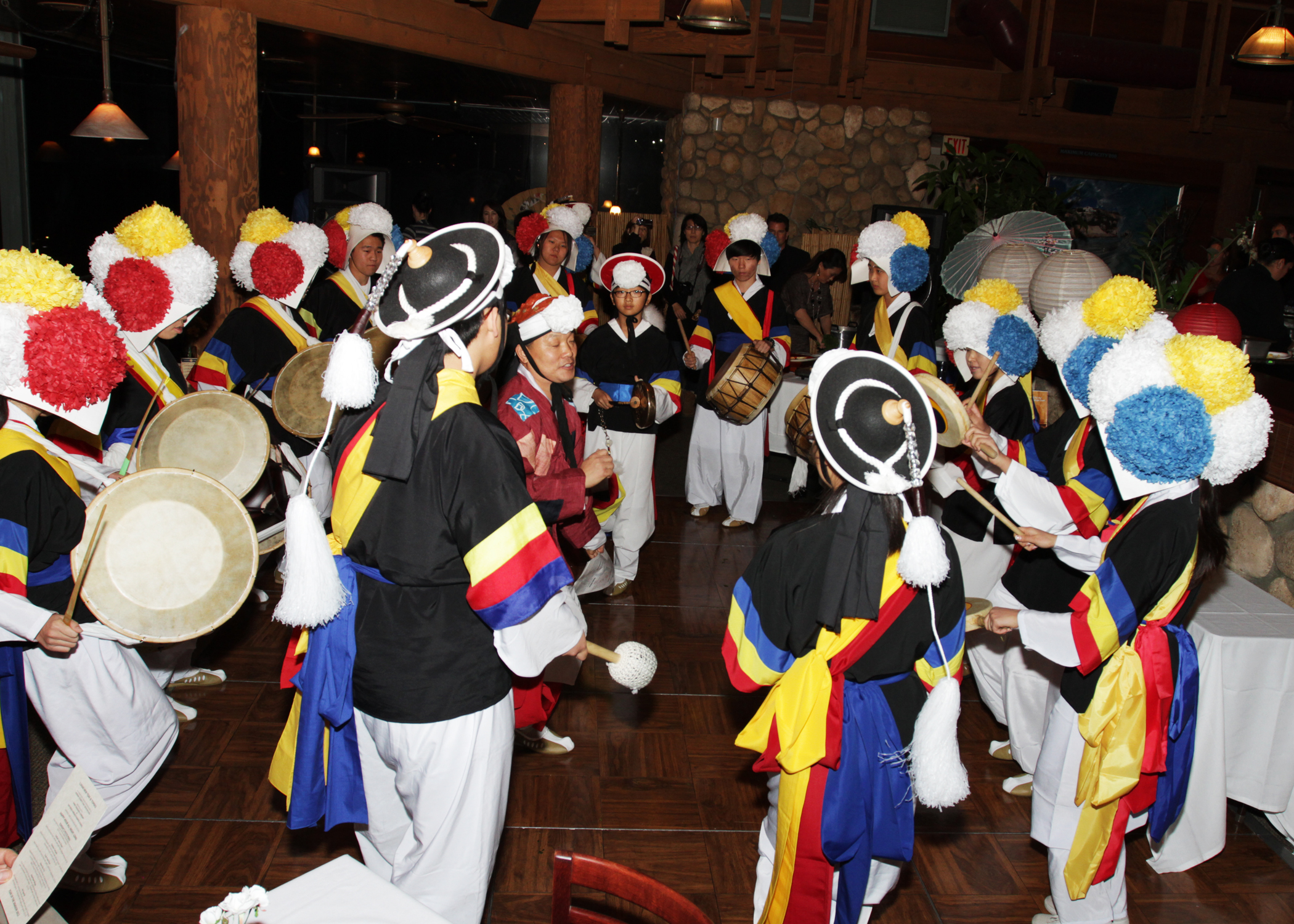
- Top to bottom, left to right: Islamic New Year celebration in Nawa, Afghanistan; Blowing the shofar on Rosh Hashanah; Satu Suro celebration in Surakarta, Indonesia; Fireworks display at Victoria Harbour, Hong Kong; Chinese New Year parade in Manhattan's Chinatown, New York City, U.S.; A woman lights the candles to celebrate Diwali in India; A family gathering to make bánh tét for Tết celebrations in Vietnam; Korean pungmul dancers celebrating Seollal in Los Angeles, California, U.S.
- Type: Cultural
- Date: Varies

Lunar New Year marks the beginning of a new year according to lunar calendars or, informally but commonly, to lunisolar calendars. Because a year of twelve lunar months is about 11 days shorter than a solar year (which determines the seasons), lunar cycle-based calendars may have strategies to take this fact into account. Pure lunar calendars have twelve lunar months invariantly and consequently their New Year is not fixed relative to the solar year; no adjustments are made. In contrast, most lunisolar calendars also have twelve lunar months, but every few years, a thirteenth "leap month" is added to resynchronise with the solar year. Consequently, neither type of calendar begins on a fixed date in the international Gregorian calendar.

The determination of the first day of a new lunar year or lunisolar year varies by culture. The event is celebrated by numerous cultures in various ways at different dates. Better-known lunar new year celebrations include those based on the (lunar) Islamic calendar which originated in the Middle East. Lunisolar new year celebrations include those of the (lunisolar) Hebrew calendar from the same region; the (lunisolar) Chinese calendar and its variations from East Asia; and the (lunisolar) Buddhist and Hindu calendars of South and Southeast Asia.

In 2023, the United Nations General Assembly recognized the Spring Festival that coincides with the lunisolar Chinese New Year and is also celebrated in Vietnam, Singapore, Malaysia, and Korea among others, designating Lunar New Year as a UN holiday. Some states in the US, including California and New York, officially celebrate the Lunar New Year as a public holiday in recognition of the lunisolar new year based on the Chinese calendar.

== Definition ==
=== Meaning ===
The term "Lunar New Year", as used in English, commonly refers to new year celebrations that are based on lunisolar calendars as well as to those based on true lunar calendars. These new year events are celebrated by billions of people across the world on the first new moon of their calendar. Typically, the new year of a purely lunar calendar is determined by the first new moon after the end of a cycle of twelve lunar months (and ignores the solar cycle). The new year of a lunisolar calendar is typically determined by the first, second or even third new moon after the winter solstice, or after an equinox.

Lunisolar New Year celebrations in East and Central Asia, such as Chinese New Year, are based on a lunisolar calendar. Chinese New Year usually falls on the second new moon after the winter solstice (occasionally the third if an intercalary month intervenes: the deciding factor is that the eleventh month must contain the solstice). Some Lunisolar New Year celebrations, such as in Korea and Vietnam, generally fall on the same day as the Chinese celebration in late January or February, due to being based on the Chinese calendar or a variation of it. However, celebration customs and holiday durations may differ.

Other Lunar New Year celebrations are based on different calendars. Lunisolar New Year celebrations of other cultures such as Burmese, Cambodian, Lao, Sri Lankan, and Thai people are based on the Buddhist calendar and occur in mid-April. The Islamic New Year (1 Muharram) is determined by the (Sunni) Islamic calendar (lunar Hijri calendar), a purely lunar calendar. (Note: The Solar Hijri calendar used by Shia Islam is purely solar.) Rosh Hashanah, the new year in the (lunisolar) Hebrew calendar, is based on the September equinox.

=== History ===
The earliest recorded use of the term "Chinese New Year" in the English language comes from the 1704 translation of the 1699 Italian book Giro del Mondo by Giovanni Francesco Gemelli Careri. The term "Lunar New Year" originated in the British Empire and its first recorded use dates back to 1865 in The London and China Telegraph, where it referred to the festival of Māgha Pūjā in Thailand. This was contrasted with the festival of Songkran, which the publication dubbed the "Solar New Year".

"Lunar New Year" was first used to refer to the Chinese New Year in legal documentation in British Hong Kong in 1968. The holiday was officially called "Chinese New Year" in British Hong Kong until the passing of the Holidays (Amendment) Ordinance 1968 replaced "Chinese New Year" with "Lunar New Year". This law was enacted following the 1967 Hong Kong riots against British colonial rule.

While "Lunisolar New Year" would be a more accurate term for Chinese New Year and other celebrations based on a lunisolar calendar, the name "Lunar New Year" has been promoted by people from some Asian countries, especially in Vietnam and South Korea, leading to a rise in its use. In the United States of America, "Lunar New Year" is strongly associated with Chinese Americans and "Chinese New Year" is commonly used as a translation by people of non-Chinese backgrounds. Chinese New Year is the official name of the celebration and holiday in some countries such as Singapore, Brunei, and Malaysia. However, the celebration has officially been known as "Spring Festival" (春节/春節 chūnjié) in China since the founding of the Republic of China in 1912 when the previous name, "Yuandan" (The First Day), was assigned to the first day of the Gregorian calendar. Chinese people outside China refer to it as both "Lunar New Year" as well as "Chinese New Year". Since at least the mid-2010s, there has been criticism in the United States regarding the use of the term "Chinese New Year" in an official capacity, particularly by Korean and Vietnamese people. Some American politicians have avoided using the term "Chinese New Year" in preference for "Lunar New Year".

In 2019, the pro–South Korea internet activist group Voluntary Agency Network of Korea launched a campaign against foreign websites, broadcasting companies, and government organizations that used the expression "Chinese New Year," in a bid to have them replace it with "Lunar New Year".

== Celebrations by region ==
=== Middle East and West Asia ===
Lunar New Year and Lunisolar New Year celebrations that originated in the Middle East fall on different days:

- The Lunar Hijri calendar used by most of Islam, is a purely lunar calendar comprising 12 lunar months: its year is shorter by about ten or eleven days than the Gregorian calendar year. Consequently Islamic New Year's Day may fall in any season: occasionally there can be two Islamic new years in one Gregorian year (as last happened in 2008). In 2023, the Islamic New Year fell on 7 or 8 July 2024 and is estimated to fall on 25 – 26 June 2025. (The Solar Hijri calendar, used in Iran, is a purely solar calendar. Its New Year's Day is always the day of the March equinox.)
- In Judaism, there are as many as four lunar new year observances. Since the Hebrew calendar is lunisolar, the days always fall in the same season.
  - Nisan is the month of the "barley ripening", or "spring" Aviv/Abib, and the book of Exodus 12:1–2, has God instructing Moses to command the Israelites to fix the new moon, the 1st day, of Nisan at the first, or head moon of the year. The talmud in Rosh Hashanah (tractate) 2a calls this the Rosh HaShana, the new year, for kings and pilgrimages. The climax of this lunar new year is the festival of Passover, which begins on 15 Nisan/Abib (Aviv). It is also the first day of secular new years in Karaite Judaism and Samaritanism.
  - 1 Elul corresponds to the New Year for Animal Tithes in the Rabbinic tradition. Elul is the sixth month, a very late summer/early autumn holiday. It is the date on which the Samaritan calendar advances a year, on the theory that 1 Elul commemorates the creation of the Earth.
  - 1 Tishrei, is called Yom teruah, Day of (trumpet) Blasts in the written Torah, and it falls on the first of the "seventh month". It is translated Feast of Trumpets in most English bible translations. This Day of trumpet Blasts was also called Rosh Hashanah, literally "new year", in Rabbinic Judaism, on the theory that it is Yom haDin, a universal judgment day for all the children of Adam including Jews. Thus the universal, secular new year. It is the date on which the Rabbinic calendar advances a year, on the theory that 1 Tishrei is the day on which the world was born. Rosh Hashanah also inaugurates the ten days known as the High Holy Days/High Holidays or Days of Awe, culminating with Yom Kippur; which is the holiest day of the year in Rabbinic Judaism. For Samaritans and Karaites, Passover remains the holiest day of the year.
  - Tu BiShvat is the New Year for Trees in Rabbinic Judaism. On this day, every tree ages one year. The age of a tree determines whether it is subject to certain tithes. In the modern era, it has become festive holiday with some ecological overtones.

=== East Asia ===
Most of East Asia celebrates the Lunisolar New Year as determined by the traditional Chinese calendar. Although commonly referred to in North America as "Lunar New Year" (in preference to "Chinese New Year"), it is actually a Lunisolar New Year. Months in the Chinese calendar track the phases of the moon but the sequence restarts soon after the December solstice. This means that almost every third year has thirteen months rather than twelve. Japan observes the Solar New Year, except for the Ryukyu islands which continues to observe the Lunisolar New Year.

- Chinese New Year (traditional Chinese: 農曆新年; simplified Chinese: 农历新年; pinyin: Nónglì Xīnnián; Jyutping: nung4 lik6 san1 nin4; Wugniu: ^{2}non-liq_{8} ^{1}sin-gnie_{2} or traditional Chinese: 春節; simplified Chinese: 春节; pinyin: Chūnjié; Jyutping: ceon1 zit3; Wugniu: ^{1}tshen-tsiq_{7}, in Hokkien: 新正; Pe̍h-ōe-jī: sin-chiaⁿ, traditional Chinese: 舊年; simplified Chinese: 旧年; pinyin: Jiùnián; Jyutping: gau6 nin4* also found in many varieties)
- Tujia New Year (Chinese: 土家新年; pinyin: Tǔjiā Xīnnián or simplified Chinese: 赶年; traditional Chinese: 趕年; pinyin: Gǎnnián)
- Tsagaan Sar (Mongolian New Year) Mongol Bichig: ᠴᠠᠭᠠᠨ ᠰᠠᠷᠠ
- Hmong New Year (Hmongic: Nongx Yangx; Chinese: 能央)
- Japanese New Year (Japanese: 正月 Shōgatsu) (before 1873)
- Ryukyu New Year (Okinawan:正月 sōgwachi)
- Korean New Year (Korean: 설날; RR: Seollal)
- Vietnamese New Year (Vietnamese: Tết Nguyên Đán; chữ Hán: 節元旦)

Tibetans and Mongols celebrate the Lunisolar New Year in February or early March, based on the closely related Tibetan calendar. Chinese Mongols celebrate Tsagaan Sar according to Chinese calendar. Because the Uyghurs based their dates on the Chinese calendar, and the Mongols and Tibetans adopted the Uyghur calendar, Tibetan and Mongolian New Year can either coincide with the Chinese New Year, or take place around one month later.

- Tsagaan Sar (Mongolian New Year) (Mongolian: Цагаан сар; Cagán sar; Mongol Bichig: ᠴᠠᠭᠠᠨ ᠰᠠᠷᠠ)
- Losar (Tibetan New Year) (Tibetan: ལོ་གསར་, Wylie: lo-gsar)

==== China ====
The history of the Chinese New Year festival can be traced back to more than 4000 years ago. Before the new year celebration was formed, ancient Chinese gathered around and celebrated at the end of harvest in autumn. However, the celebration is not Mid-Autumn Festival, during which Chinese gathered with family and worship the moon. In the Classic of Poetry, a poem written during Western Zhou (1045 BC – 771 BC), by an anonymous farmer, described how people cleaned up millet stack-sites, toasted to guests with mijiu, killed lambs and cooked the meat, went to their master's home, toasted to the master, and cheered for long lives together, in the 10th month of an ancient solar calendar, which was in autumn. The celebration is believed to be one of the prototypes of the Chinese New Year.

The first dated Chinese new year celebration can be traced back to the Warring States period (475 BC – 221 BC). In Lüshi Chunqiu, an exorcistic ritual called "Big Nuo (大儺)" was recorded being carried out in the ending day of a year to expel illness in Qin. Later, after Qin unified China and the Qin dynasty was founded, the ritual was continued. It evolved to cleaning up houses thoroughly in the preceding days of Chinese New Year.

The first mentioning of the celebration of the start of a new year was recorded in Han dynasty (202 BC – 220 AD). In the book Simin Yueling (四民月令), written by Eastern Han's agronomist and writer Cui Shi (崔寔), the celebration was recorded by stating "The starting day of the first month, is called 'Zheng Ri'. I bring my wife and children, to worship ancestors and commemorate my father." Later he wrote: "Children, wife, grandchildren, and great-grandchildren all serve pepper wine to their parents, make their toast, and wish their parents good health. It's a thriving view." People also went to acquaintances' homes and wished each other a happy new year. In Book of the Later Han Volume 27, 吴良, a county officer was recorded going to his prefect's house with a government secretary, toasting to the prefect and praising the prefect's merit.

Chinese New Year is the grandest ancient traditional festival in China, commonly known as "Guo Nian". This festival means the beginning of spring and the arrival of the new year. The customs of Chinese New Year include sticking Spring Festival couplets, buying New Year's goods, and having family dinner together.

==== Korea ====
The earliest references to Korean New Year are found in 7th-century Chinese historical works, the Book of Sui and the Old Book of Tang, containing excerpts of celebrations during the New Year in the Silla Kingdom for Korean calendar, which was influenced by the Tang dynasty's calendar system. Korea's own record of new year celebration is found in Samguk yusa (Memorabilia of the Three Kingdoms), compiled in the 13th century. Under the rule of 21st King of Silla, new year was celebrated in 488 AD. Then celebration of Korean New Year have continued to Goryeo and Joseon. By the 13th century, Korean New Year was one of the nine major Korean festivals that included ancestral rites, according to the Korean historical work, the Goryeosa.

As opposed to red envelopes, Korean New Year tends to involve white envelopes.

==== Taiwan ====
While there is little recorded history of when Lunisolar New Year was first observed in Taiwan, it is known that the indigenous population had other ceremonies and did not originally celebrate the festival. It was likely first celebrated by the Hakka or Hoklo populations that migrated from now part of mainland China to the island during the 17th century. Due to Taiwan's population being mostly Han Chinese, its Lunisolar New Year celebration is very similar to that of mainland China, especially in regards to traditions. In addition, some Lunisolar New Year's customs during the Ming and Qing Dynasties were preserved in Taiwan. However, in modern day, there can be more of a focus on visiting Buddhist or Taoist temples with extended family members. There are also notable variations to the food that is eaten during this time, such as the consumption of pineapple cakes and other products derived from pineapples or daikon since the latter is a homophone for "good fortune" in Hokkien.

==== Japan ====
Since 1873, the official Japanese New Year has been celebrated according to the Gregorian calendar, on 1 January of each year, New Year's Day (元日, Ganjitsu). Prior to 1872, traditional events of the Japanese New Year were celebrated on the first day of the year on the modern Tenpō calendar, the last official lunisolar calendar and, prior to Jōkyō calendar, the Chinese version.

While the Lunisolar New Year is not commonly celebrated in Japan, it is celebrated in various Chinatowns within the country, such as Yokohama Chinatown, Nankin-machi, and Shinichi Chukagai in Nagasaki.

==== Ryukyu Islands ====
In the Ryukyu Islands (Okinawa Prefecture and Amami Islands) in Japan, people traditionally celebrate Lunisolar New Year on the first day of the Chinese calendar.

=== South Asia ===
These South Asian traditional lunisolar celebrations are observed according to the local lunisolar calendars. They are influenced by Indian tradition, which marks the system of lunar months in a solar sidereal year. A separate solar new year also exists for those Indian regions which use solar months in a solar sidereal year.

- Gudi Padwa: Maharashtra and Goa.
- Ugadi: Andhra Pradesh, Telangana and Karnataka
- Puthandu: Tamil Nadu
- Chaitra Navaratri: North and Central India
- Balipratipada: Gujarat, Rajasthan
- Cheti Chand: Sindhi Hindus
- Navreh: Kashmiri Hindus
- Sajibu Cheiraoba: Manipur
- Mha Puja: Nepal (Newaris)

The following are influenced by the Tibetan calendar:

- Galdan Namchot: Ladakh
- Losoong: Sikkim
- Losar: Arunachal Pradesh (Monpas)
- Gyalpo Lhosar: Sherpas
- Tamu Lhosar: Gurungs
- Sonam Lhosar: Tamangs

==== India ====
Various lunisolar calendars continue to be used throughout India in traditional and religious life. However, they differ from the Chinese lunisolar calendar used in East Asia. The two most common lunisolar new year celebrations in India are Diwali, and Gudi Padwa/Ugadi/Puthandu. Diwali typically falls in October or November, and Gudi Padwa/Ugadi/Puthandu typically falls in April.

In the Hindu calendar, a common year has twelve lunar months (like the Islamic calendar) but a leap year of thirteen lunar months is needed every three years or so, to reset the relationship with the solar year. The cycle begins with the first new moon after the March equinox, or of the sun's (apparent) entry into the constellation of Aries. In ancient times, the sun's entry into Aries coincided with the equinox. However, due to the earth's axial precession, the sidereal year is slightly longer than the tropical year, causing the dates to gradually drift apart. Today, the sun's entry into Aries occurs around 18 April, according to astronomical definitions. Some traditional calendars are still marked by the sun's actual movements while others have since been fixed to the Gregorian calendar.

The sun's entry into Aries is known as meṣa saṅkrānti in Sanskrit, and is observed as Mesha Sankranti and Songkran in South and South-east Asian cultures.

=== Southeast Asia ===
The following Southeast Asian Lunar New Year celebrations are observed according to the local lunisolar calendar and are influenced by Indian Hindu traditions.

- Nyepi (Balinese New Year): Bali, Indonesia
- Rija Nukan (Cham New Year): Chams

The following Southeast Asian Lunar New Year celebration is observed according to the local lunisolar calendar and is influenced by Islamic traditions.

- Satu Suro (Javanese New Year): The Javanese calendar follows a purely lunar calendar of 12 months that retrogresses through the Gregorian and Julian calendar years. As in the Islamic calendar, the day of Javanese New Year may thus fall in any season on the calendar.

==== Malaysia ====
Malaysia is a multi-cultural country. The three dominant ethnic groups in Malaysia are the Malays, the Chinese, and the Indians. Each group has its unique culture and traditional festivals. Public holidays are declared on the three important festivals celebrated by the Malays, Chinese, and Indians, namely Hari Raya Puasa, Chinese New Year and Deepavali respectively.

As timing of these three important festivals fluctuates due to their reliance on the lunar calendars, they occasionally occur close to one another—every 33 years to be exact. Malaysians has named this phenomenon Kongsi Raya (Gongxi Raya), a Malaysian portmanteau, denoting the Chinese New Year and Hari Raya Aidilfitri festivals.

==== Singapore ====
Lunisolar New Year is officially known as "Chinese New Year" in Singapore. It is celebrated in Singapore primarily by members of the Chinese diaspora, including the Peranakans and their descendants, who make up three-quarters of the population. They include those who are Hokkien, Cantonese and Teochew from southeastern China; Hainanese from the island province of Hainan; and Hakka, a migrant group spread out all over China. The Peranakans have been in the region for over 400 years and also have mixed Malay and European ancestry. Each ethnic group has its own set of traditions, as well as creating new ones incorporating elements from other cultures like Malays and Indians.

==== Vietnam ====
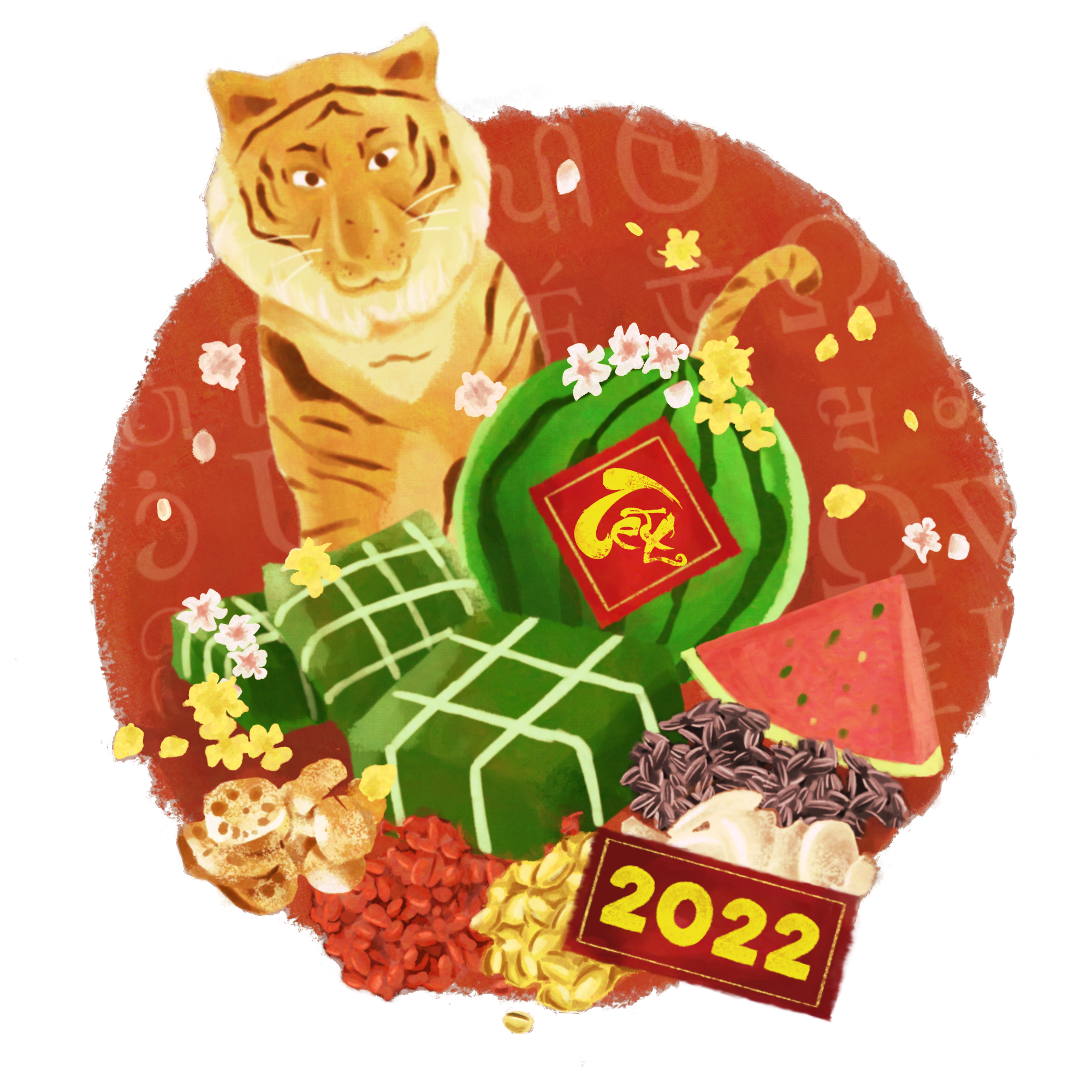
Tết in Vietnam 2022

Chinese migrants brought with them their own policies, cultures, and traditions to Vietnam. The Lunisolar New Year was passed to the Vietnamese people and has stayed relatively intact through the centuries, despite uneasy and often hostile relations between the two countries. The main difference between the Chinese and Vietnamese calendars is that the Vietnamese zodiac replaces the Ox and Rabbit in the Chinese zodiac with the Buffalo and Cat, respectively. However, it is noteworthy that the Tết Nguyên Đán (Spring Festival) which is celebrated in late January or in the first half of February coincides with the onset of Spring in the regions of northern Vietnam and parts of southern China where the ancient Laos–Thailand kingdom of Âu Lạc and some regions of the Baiyue people are located. The celebration marks the beginning of a new planting season, particularly rice. There is also the historical legend of the origin of bánh chưng, which started on the occasion of Tết. All early written records of the country have been destroyed through the millennia by numerous invasions from various groups.

Vietnamese New Year can also be traced back to the Lý dynasty (1009 AD – 1226 AD). Vietnamese people often celebrated their Tết holiday by painting tattoos on themselves, drinking rice liquor, eating betel nuts, and making bánh chưng, as well as pickled onions. During the period of Emperor Lê Thánh Tông (1442 AD – 1497 AD), Tết was considered a significant festival in Vietnam. Today, the rule for determining Vietnamese New Year day is the same with that of China, so the day of Lunisolar New Year in China and Vietnam mostly coincide. Lucky money is also given on Lunisolar New Year.

=== North America ===
==== Canada ====
Hobiyee, also spelled Hoobiyee, Hobiiyee and Hoobiiyee, is the new year of the Nisg̱a'a people, celebrated in February or March. It signifies the emergence of the first crescent moon and begins the month Buxw-laḵs. Celebrations of Hobiyee are done by Nisg̱a'a wherever they are located, but the largest celebrations are in Nisg̱a'a itself and in areas with a large Nisg̱a'a presence like Vancouver.

== Recognition by the United Nations ==
After a decade of advocating for its inclusion by China and also other countries in Asia, the United Nations unanimously passed a resolution at its headquarters in December 2023, to recognize the "Lunar New Year" (based on the lunisolar Chinese calendar), as a floating holiday, at the 78th session of the United Nations General Assembly. This means that starting in 2024, UN bodies are encouraged to avoid holding meetings during that day, marking Lunar New Year as the eighth floating holiday that is observed by UN staff internationally.

The United Nations's Lunar New Year holiday, recognizes the spring festival that coincides with the Chinese New Year and is also celebrated in Vietnam, Indonesia, Singapore, Malaysia, Japan, Korea, Canada, and Suriname. Some states in the US, including California and New York, officially celebrate the Lunar New Year as a public holiday coinciding with the Chinese New Year.

== See also ==
- East Asian cultural sphere
- List of lunar calendars
- List of lunisolar calendars
- New Year's Day
- South Asian cultural sphere
- South and Southeast Asian solar New Year

== Bibliography ==
- Kizer, Jessica M. (2014). "Lunar New Year". Asian American Society: An Encyclopedia. Sage Publications, Inc. ISBN 9781452281902. OCLC 880374731.
- Zhong, Ai (2019), "A linguistic celebration of Chinese New Year in the Modern World", China Beyond the Binary: Race, Gender, and the Use of Story, Cambridge Scholars Publishing
