= John James Bond =

English chronologist

- Born: 9 December 1819
- Died: 9 December 1883 (aged 64); England
- Occupation: chronologist

John James Bond (9 December 1819 – 9 December 1883) was an English chronologist, who served in the record office of Queen Victoria.

== Career ==
Bond entered the public service at the age of 21 as a clerk, assisting Henry Cole, his brother-in-law, in the arrangement of the public records when they were transferred from Whitehall to the Royal Riding School of Carlton House. He was a senior assistant keeper of the Public Record Office at the time of his death.

== Works ==
Bond compiled Handy Book of Rules and Tables for verifying dates of historical events, and of public and private documents, giving tables of regional years of English sovereigns, with leading dates, from the conquest to the present time, London, 1866, 1869, and in 1875 an edition by Walford Dakin Selby.
