= Solar New Year =

Beginning of solar calendar year

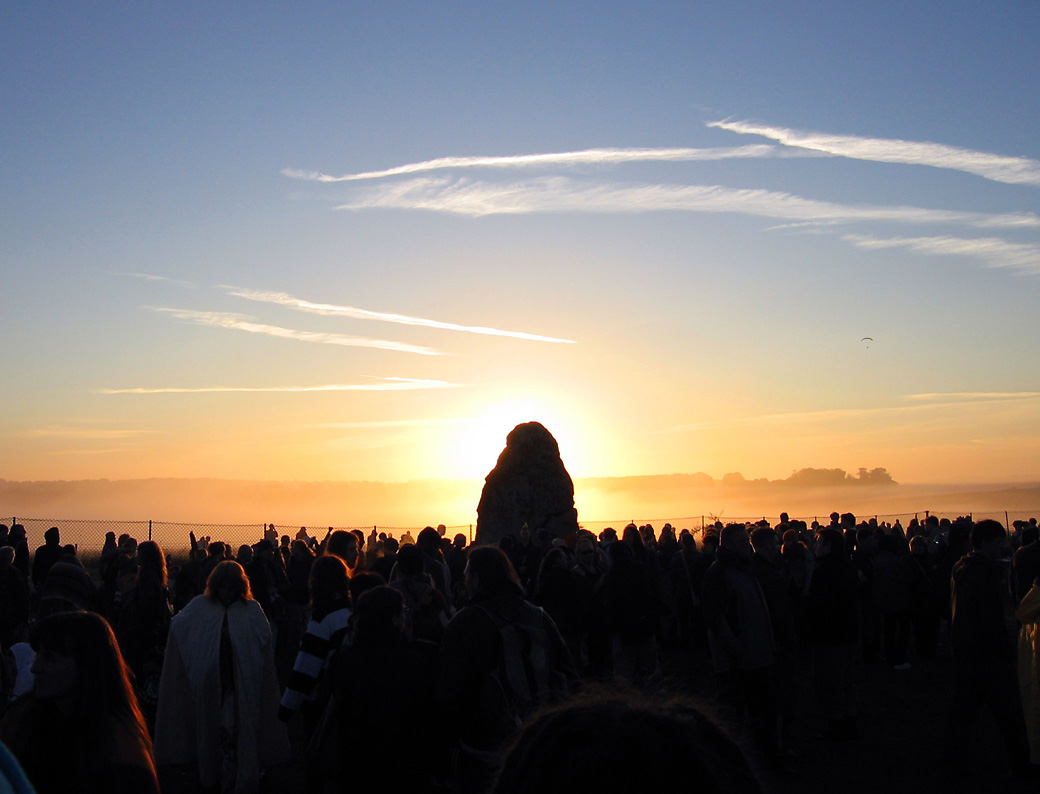
The sun behind the Heel Stone of Stonehenge, at sunrise on the summer solstice

The Solar New Year is the beginning of the solar calendar year. This event is observed at different times of year and with varying practices in cultures across the globe. The most common bases chosen to begin a new calendar year are the winter solstice, summer solstice, the spring equinox and the autumnal equinox. South and South-east Asian solar calendars are more formally linked to astronomical events.

Some of the more widely known solar new year celebrations include:

- Enkutatash (Ethiopian calendar): about ten days before the autumnal equinox
- January 1 in the Gregorian and Julian calendars (same number, different days): at present (Note: The Julian calendar gains a day against the true solar year every 129 years. In other words, the Julian calendar gains 3.1 days every 400 years, while the Gregorian calendar gains 0.1 day over the same time. The Julian calendar will gain another day in 2100 but the Gregorian will not.) about twelve and twenty-five days respectively after the northern winter solstice.
- Iranian New Year (Nowruz) : precisely the northern spring equinox

The various solar new years celebrated in South/SE Asia, whose new year is determined by the position of the Sun relative to the constellation of Aries, such as

- Vishu : Vishu falls on the first day of the month of Medam in the Malayalam Calendar
- Cambodian New Year: about six or seven days before the northern spring equinox
- Tamil New Year (Tamil: தமிழ் புத்தாண்டு, romanized: Puttāṇṭu, lit. 'new year'): about 24 or 25 days after the northern spring equinox
- Vaisakhi: about 24 or 25 days after the northern spring equinox
- Pohela Boishakh (Bengali calendar): about 24 or 25 days after the northern spring equinox
- Pana Sankranti (Odia: ପଣା ସଂକ୍ରାନ୍ତି): about 24 or 25 days after the northern spring equinox.

== See also ==
- Lunar New Year – Beginning of a year in a lunar calendar
- Lunisolar New Year – First day inn a lunisolar calendar
  - Chinese New Year – Traditional Chinese holiday
- Indian cultural sphere – Cultural sphere of India beyond the Indian subcontinent
- Iranian cultural sphere – Sociocultural region in West and Central Asia
- East Asian cultural sphere – Areas historically influenced by Chinese culture
- New Year – Beginning of the calendar year
  - New Year's Day – First day of the year in the Gregorian calendar; 1 January
