= Nayrouz =

Coptic celebration on Sep. 11

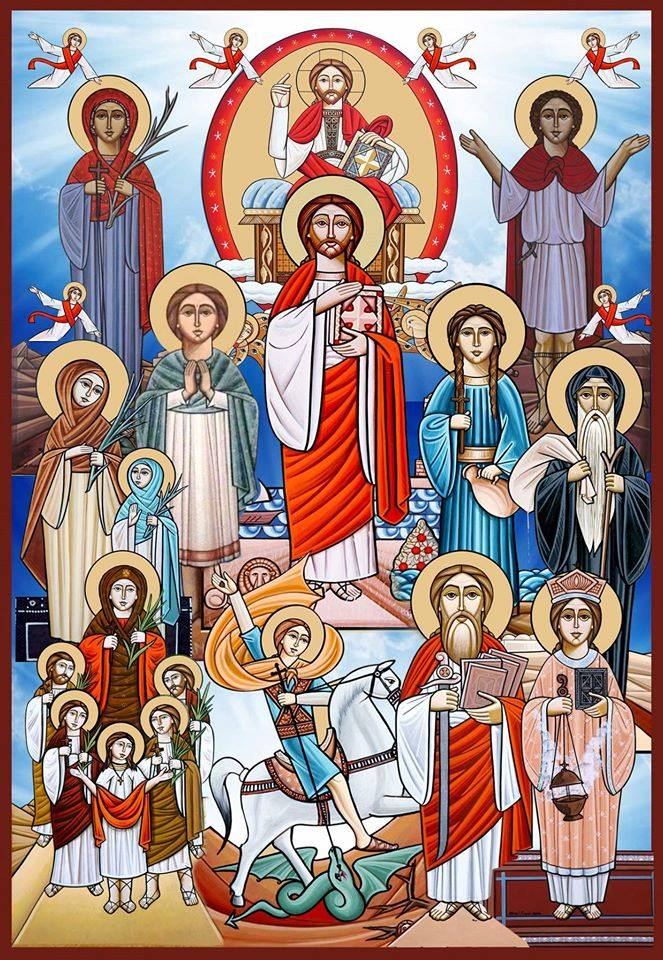
- Also called: The crown of the year
- Observed by: Copts worldwide
- Type: Cultural, religious
- Significance: Day of new year on the Coptic calendar, commemoration of the martyrs.
- Celebrations: Services on the eve of the feast or that morning
- Date: 1 Thout (11 September)
- Frequency: Annual

Nayrouz (Arabic: النيروز, Coptic: ⲡⲓⲭⲗⲟⲙ ⲛ̀ⲧⲉ ϯⲣⲟⲙⲡⲓ, lit. 'the crown of the year') is a feast when martyrs and confessors are commemorated within the Coptic Orthodox Church. Celebrated on September 11, the day is both the start of the Coptic new year and its first month, Thout. Nayrouz is also commemorated by Ethiopian Christians who also call it Enkutatash. Children wear new clothes and give bouquets of flowers to people.

Despite having religious connotations and being mainly celebrated by the Coptic Christian community today, the festival used to be much more widespread and celebrated by both Christian and Muslim Egyptians. However, due to repressions by the central government, it lost much of its significance as a popular festival. When it was popular, Muslim scholars such as Ibn Taymiyya and Ibn al-Hajj al-Abdari urged Muslim laity to not participate in Coptic festivals, especially this one. Ibn Taymiyya laid out a discussion of rituals, time, and place and stated none should be imitated.

== Origins and etymology ==
The name of the feast comes from the Iranian festival of Nowruz (Persian: نوروز, lit. 'new day'), which originated in Ancient Iran, which is widely celebrated in the Middle East up to this day. There are a few theories about the origin of Nayrouz as celebrated by Copts. One is that it was introduced to Egypt when the Achaemenids ruled (sometime around the 6th century BCE). The recorded customs of lighting fires, sprinkling water, special food and clothes, presents, and the procession of an Emir hold similarities to records of the Persian festival, in addition to the name being Persian in origin. Another is that it was a localized adaptation of Saturnalia, a winter festival which lifted social and legal restrictions and involved choosing a mock king. It is also considered that it may have been of ancient Egyptian origin, which was claimed by medieval Muslim writers, who stated it was a festival honoring the stars. Some favor this while others consider it unlikely, as no record of public revelry exists before Islamic rule in Egypt and the adoption of the name from Persia would be strange.

A derivation from a Coptic word ⲛⲓⲓⲁⲣⲱⲟⲩ, "the rivers", is considered improbable, as it does not occur anywhere in the Synaxarium, and there is no evidence of the use of the supposed Coptic etymon in historical sources. The recorded Bohairic name for the new year was ⲡⲓⲭⲗⲟⲙ ⲛ̀ⲧⲉ ϯⲣⲟⲙⲡⲓ pi-khlom ente-tirompi, "the crown of the year."

During the reign of Khosrow II (r. 590–628), the Persians reached Egypt for the second time in history, and established control for a decade (Sasanian Egypt). According to Touraj Daryaee, the celebration of Nayrouz in Egypt may be one of the lasting Sasanian influences in Egypt.

Its celebration falls on the 1st day of the month of Thout, the first month of the Egyptian year, which for AD 1901 to 2098 usually coincides with 11 September, except before a Gregorian leap year when it begins September 12.

The ancient Egyptian festival celebrated on the first of Thout was called the Opening of the Year. It celebrated the birth and death of Osiris and The Lamentations of Isis and Nephthys was recited at the start, where afterwards feasting and drinking commenced.

The other names for this festival included "coming-out of Sothis", "beginning of the year" and "birth of Re", and in the New Kingdom it and the next two days may have been a public holiday where workers had time off. There are accounts of lighting fires, torches, or candles at night at this time or during ceremonies, and record exists of a banquet occurring the night before, possibly held near the tomb, and which was accompanied by making offerings to the dead. Water was collected from the Nile prior to this date and used in purification rituals. Buildings, statues, and occasionally obelisks were consecrated at this time. Incense was offered during the consecration and to the dead. Other offerings were made to the dead as well. The statues of the dead had their clothes changed, eye paint applied, and the Opening of the Mouth ritual was performed. Offerings were also made to the gods (including the Pharaoh) and temples, a notable offering being cloth, and the pharaoh gave out cloth to the common people as well. These bear some similarities to the later practices associated with Nayrouz.

Herotodus told the alleged story of a man named Seostris, who was trapped by his brother (who he'd given rule over Egypt) at a banquet and planned to burn him and his six sons alive. He used two of his sons to make a bridge through the fire and he and his four remaining sons escaped. Diodorus related a similar tale without mention of the two sons death, saying the incident occurred in a tent made of reeds, possibly an eshah, temporary buildings made of dry maize stalks or reeds which are still sometimes seen in Egypt. This has been connected to remarks attributed to Manetho, quoted by Plutarch, which alleged human sacrifices were performed in Ancient Egypt during the New Year, where people were set alight. This has been connected to the symbolic burning of the Emir at the Nayrouz festival as well as the New Year Festival held at Mankunduchi in Zanzibar, called Naoruz or Siku ya Mwaka. Others connect the Mankunduchi festival more directly to being brought to Zanzibar by Persians. Human sacrifice has very little evidence of having occurred in Egypt, and is specific to the First Dynasty according to all known evidence.

== History and traditions ==
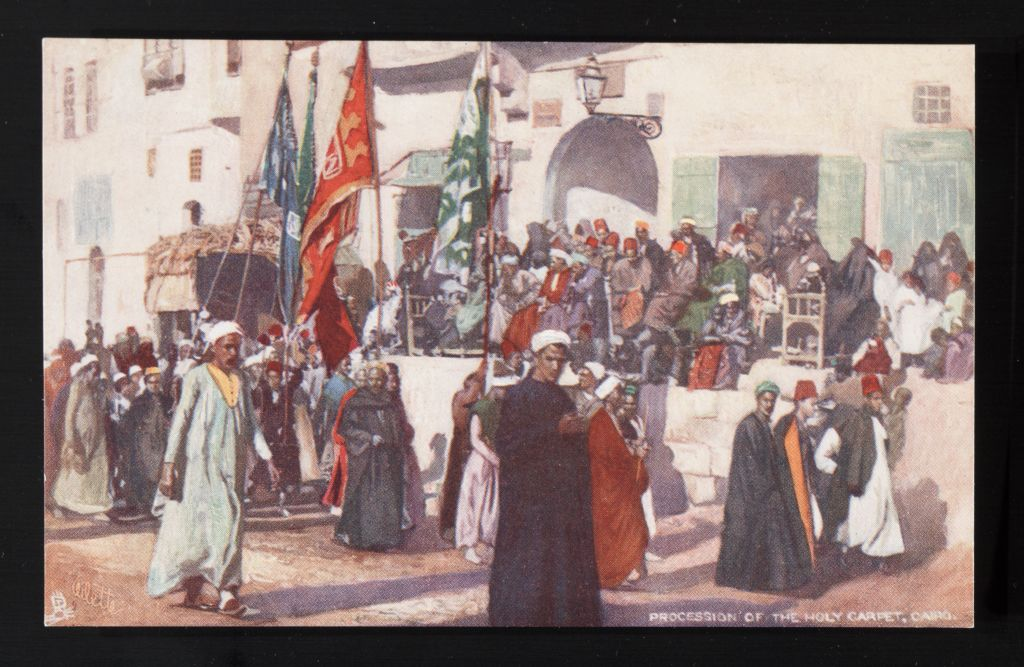
Procession of the Holy Carpet (kiswa) in Cairo. The similar procession happened during the celebration of Nayrouz in 1123

The first documented celebration of Nayrouz in Egypt dates back to 912 AD.

Both Christians and Muslims, the elite and the common people participated in Nayrouz celebrations, with customs such as the exchange of gifts, eating special food, and wearing new garments observed by the upper class. The Fatimid court, for example, would distribute luxurious fabrics and robes, and sometimes even money, to mark the occasion. For the celebration in 1123, a special kiswah and other luxurious fabrics were produced at the Alexandrian textile workshop. The common people also engaged in special food and drink, including the consumption of wine and beer in public.

Nayrouz was also characterized by sexual overtones and transvestism, with people engaging in water games and stripping to their underclothes in public. Transvestites and prostitutes would gather in specific areas, such as under the Pearl Palace, to be seen and heard by the Egyptian ruler. The festival also featured masks and masquerades, compared to European carnivals, with crowds marching in the streets of Cairo, theatrical performances, and even man-made imitations of elephants.

The high point of Nayrouz was the procession of the "emir of Nayrouz", who was elected by the Cairene crowd. This "emir" was expected to be a wanton and "of firm nature", and would ride a small and ugly donkey, possibly a remnant of a pagan rite. The "emir" would "visit" the homes of dignitaries and officials, and hand them a statement about a "debt". Anyone who refused to pay would be scorned, cursed, and hard-pressed until willing to clear the "debt". Privacy was often violated, with gates broken and water poured on doorsteps of those who locked their homes to prevent intruders. Frazer noted the similarity between "emir of Nayrouz" and Lord of Misrule.

Despite the festive nature of Nayrouz, there were also criticisms of its negative effects, not just on the common people but on the learned as well. Schools would be shut down, teachers were attacked, insulted, and sometimes even thrown into fountains.

While the Persian festival Nowruz, the origin of the word the festival is commonly known by, is celebrated in spring, Nayrouz is a fall festival. It traditionally coincides with the start of indunation of the Nile, the completion of wine fermentation, the harvesting of dates, and Coptic liturgies to this day recite prayers for water during the season of Indunation. This is one of several days when it has been customary for Copts to visit the graves of dead relatives.

During the year long mourning period recorded in 1897, this is also one of the days of the year when women would cry and wail two or three times after the initial 40 days following a death. They would also visit the cemetery. Such visits are called ‘tal’a’ (pl. tula’) meaning "outing". Priests would accompany families to the cemetery to burn incense on the graves and pray alongside families and were compensated with a fee. Large banquets called mawajib were organized during tula' and took place at the cemetery. Women would also pour libations of water for the dead.

Thout is associated with red dates which are in turn associated with Martyrs; The red outside represents blood, and the white inside represents purity.

== Decline ==
The festival was frequently repressed by authorities and theologians in medieval Cairo. The Abbasid governor of Egypt ordered transvestites who participated in the festival to march around a mosque in Old Cairo in 913 to be ridiculed, and in 946 the custom of spraying water during the festival was banned. In 974, al-Muizz forbade the lighting of bonfires and spraying water on the festival, and in 1023 the "play with water" was banned once again. Some time prior to 1198, celebrations were interdicted. In 1380, the play with water was banned again, and individuals were punished in public, including having their hands chopped off. In 1385, Sultan Barquq ordered the celebrations to be abolished altogether, and officials arrested those found participating in the festival. According to another source, until 1389 only the sprinkling of water and beating with leather were allowed; the lighting of bonfires was restricted to the dwelling of the Copts.

During the Nayrouz of 1435, no festivities were seen because of the sultan's ban. About that time, the historian al-Maqrizi remarked on the disappearance of the festival altogether. Despite the efforts to repress the celebration, in the 1860s-70s and in 1914, a German doctor named Klunzinger and a man named Leeder both observed processions of the Emir in Upper Egyptian villages. In the early 19th century, a French artist named Rifaud observed a similar procession, which he depicted as featuring men, women, and children in the procession carrying dates. Its survival was potentially due to the distance from the central bureaucracy.

== The Coptic year ==
The chronology of the Coptic Orthodox Church begins when Diocletian became Roman emperor in 284 AD. His reign was marked by torture of Christians to force them to deny their faith, as well as by mass executions, especially in Egypt. It is believed this time was one of the worst times that the Coptic church faced, known to believers as "the martyrdom era". Hence, the Coptic year is identified by the abbreviation A.M. (for Anno Martyrum or "Year of the Martyrs"). It should not be confused with the A.M. abbreviation used for the unrelated Jewish year, which is Anno Mundi ("year of the world").

== See also ==
- Coptic calendar
- Copts
- Coptic Orthodox Church
- Sasanian Egypt
- Nowruz
- Opening of the Year

== Sources ==
- Daryaee, Touraj. Middle Persian Papyri from the Sasanian Occupation of Egypt in the Seventh Century CE (I) (PDF). Sasanika. Archived from the original (PDF) on 2017-07-09.
