= Satu Suro =

First day of the new year in the Javanese calendar

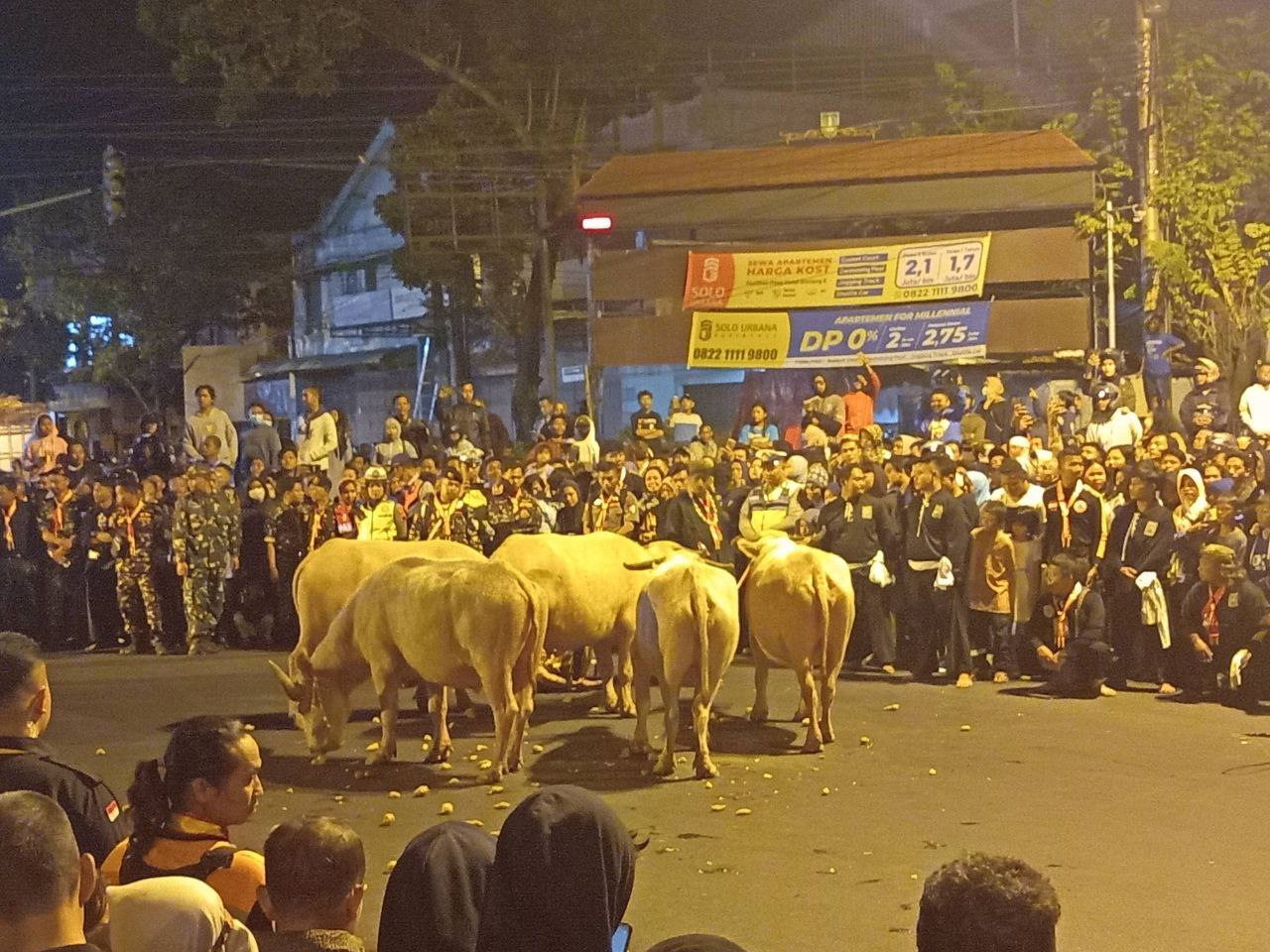
An event of Satu Suro in Surakarta, 2023

Satu Suro (Javanese: ꦱꦶꦗꦶꦱꦸꦫ, romanized: Siji Suro) is the first day of the Javanese calendar year in the month of Suro (also transcribed as Sura), corresponding with the first Islamic month of Muharram. It is mainly celebrated in Java, Indonesia, and by Javanese people living elsewhere.

Satu Suro has numerous associations in Javanese folk tales and superstitions in Java that vary considerably through regional variation in cultural practices. The prevalent theme of most Satu Suro superstitions is the danger of going out from home, similar to the Balinese holiday of silence, Nyepi.

A 1988 Indonesian film, Malam Satu Suro, explores the dangers and superstitions about leaving home on the night of Satu Suro.

== Rituals During the Eve of Satu Suro ==
The Javanese day begins at the sunset of the previous day, not at midnight; as such, considerable emphasis is placed on the eve of the first day of the month of Suro.

Satu Suro rituals include:

- Meditation, a common practice in the Kejawèn religion. The objective is to examine what has been done in the past year and to prepare what will be done in the future. The two main types of Satu Suro meditation include:

- Tapa Bisu: meditation in silence;
- Tapa Kungkum: meditation while submerged underwater.

- Tirakatan and tuguran: Staying up all night engaged in self-reflection and prayer, often accompanied by wayang kulit (shadow puppetry). Many people also visit graves and holy sites during tirakatan.
- Ruwatan: rituals to spiritually cleanse an area, such as a house or building, from evil spirits and calamity.
- Kirab Malam Satu Suro: in the city of Surakarta (Solo), a traditional cleansing ritual of the royal pusaka (heirloom) items held at the Palace of Surakarta.
- Jamasan: A Ritual where Pusaka (Heirlooms) are cleansed, cleaned and maintained, this includes Jamasan of Keris/Tosan Aji, Gamelan and Horse-Drawn Carriages

== See also ==
- Islamic calendar
