= Byzantine calendar =

Orthodox calendar used c. 691–1728

Today (at UTC+00)
- Thursday, 29 October 2026
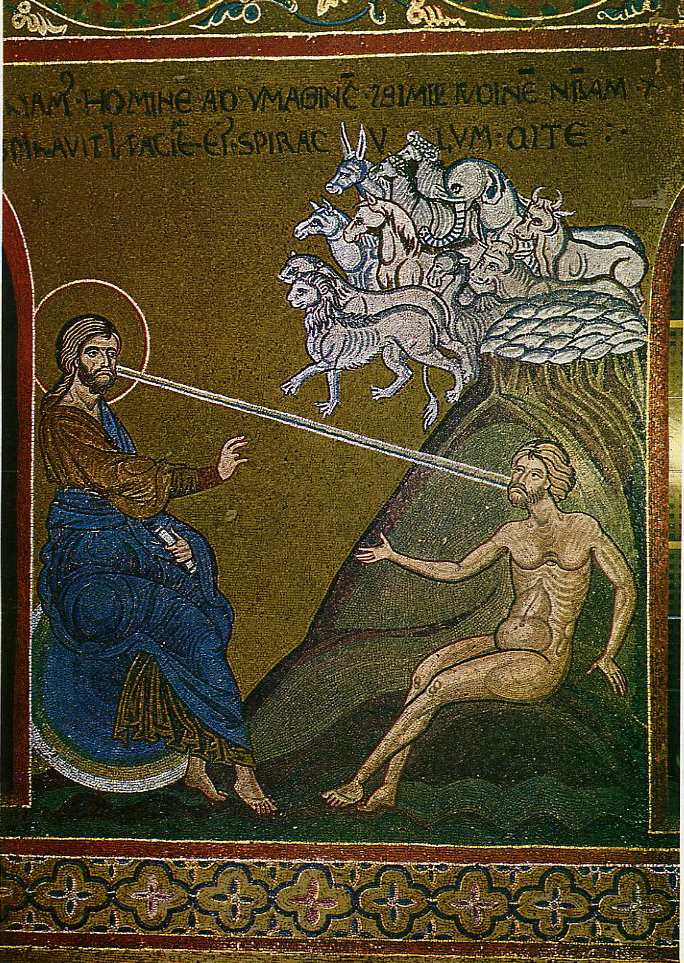
- Byzantine mosaic of the Creation of Adam (Monreale Cathedral)
- Julian: 16 October, AD 2026 (AM 7535)
Other calendars
Akan	Kuruyaw
Armenian	11 Trē 1476
Aztec	Atlcahualo 7, 7 Xōchitl
Babylonian	16 Tashritu, 2337 SE
Balinese pawukon	Menga, Pasah, Laba, Wage, Paniron, Wraspati of Watugunung, Brahma, Urungan, Suka
Bengali	13 Kartik, BS 1433
Chinese	Yang Fire Rat・Legs Mansion; Fire Horse Year, Month 9, Day 20 (Shuangjiang, 9 days until Lidong)
Common Era	29 October 2026 CE
Coptic	19 Paopi, AM 1743
Egyptian	16 Phamenoth, 2775 NE
Ethiopian	19 Ṭeqemt, 2019 Amätä Məhrät
French Republican	Décade I, Septidi de Brumaire de l'Année 235 de la République
Gregorian	29 October, AD 2026
Hebrew	18 Cheshvan, AM 5787
Hindu	Rohiṇi・Varīyas; Solar: 12 Kārtika, 1948 SE; Lunisolar: Caturthī, Kṛishna pakṣa of Āśvina, 2083 VE; Rāudra・5127 KY・1,872,877
Icelandic	Fimmtudagur, 6 Gormánuður 2026
Islamic	17 Jumada al-awwal, AH 1448 (using tabular method)
ISO week date	2026-W44-4
Japanese	19 Nagatsuki, Reiwa 8 (Sōkō, 9 days until Rittō)
Julian day	2461343
Korean	19 Gaedal, 4359 DE
Maya	13.0.14.1.0; 13 Zac, 7 Ahau
Roman	ante diem XVII Kalendas Novembres, MMDCCLXXIX AUC
Solar Hijri	7 Aban, SH 1405
Tibetan	19 tha skar, me pho rta 2153 or 1772 or 1000

The Byzantine calendar, also called the Roman calendar, (Note: The term Byzantine was first applied to the Eastern Roman Empire by the German historian Hieronymus Wolf in 1557, later popularized by French scholars during the 18th century to refer to the Roman Empire after the seat of the Empire was moved from Rome to Constantinople. "Eastern Roman Empire" itself is another anachronous term not used until after the Ottoman conquest. The empire's citizens referred to themselves as Romaioi ('Romans'), their emperor was the "Roman Emperor", and their empire was the Basileia ton Romaion ('Empire of the Romans'). The Latin West designated the empire as "Romania".) the Creation Era of Constantinople (Note: Ancient Greek: Ἔτη Γενέσεως Κόσμου κατὰ Ῥωμαίους, lit. 'Roman year since the creation of the universe'.) or the Era of the World (Note: Ancient Greek: Ἔτος Κτίσεως Κόσμου or Ἔτος Κόσμου, abbreviated as ε.Κ.), was the calendar used by the Eastern Orthodox Church from c. 691 to 1728 in the Ecumenical Patriarchate. (Note: (in Greek) "Εἰς ὅλα τὰ πατριαρχικὰ ἕγγραφα μέχρι Φεβρ. 1596 γίνεται χρῆσις τῆς Ἴνδικτιὤνος καὶ τῆς ἀπὸ κτίσεως κόσμου χρονολογίας, ἐνῶ ἡ μετὰ Χριστὸν χρονολογίαν χρησιμοποιεῖται διἀ πρώτην φορἀν ὕπὸ τοῦ πατριάρχου Θεοφἀνους Ά κατἀ Φεβρ. 1597, κατὀπιν ὕπὸ Κυρίλλου τοῦ Λουκἀρεως τὀ 1626, καθιεροῦται δἐ ἐπισἡμως ὕπὸ τῆς Ἐκκλησίας τὀ 1728, ἐπικρατησἀσης τῆς ἀπὀ Χριστοῦ μετἀ τῆς Ἴνδικτιῶνος (Κ. Δελικἀνη, ἔνθ' ἄν., Β', κβ'. Φ. Βαφεἴδου, ἔνθ' ἄν., Γ', 94, Κωνσταντινοὐπολις 1912).") It was also the official calendar of the Byzantine Empire from 988 to 1453 and it was used in Russia from c. 988 to 1700. (Note: "The Era of Byzantium...often cited in the form annus mundi, is usual in the East from the seventh century and all but unknown in the West. The reference point is Creation, 1 September 5509 B.C., which may be compared with the mundane dates computed by Eusebius-Jerome (5198 B.C.), the Era of Alexandria (5502 B.C.), the Hippolytan Era (5500 B.C.), the Jewish Era (3761 B.C.), and the Vulgate date of 3952 B.C. calculated by Bede. The Byzantine Era survived the capture of Constantinople, and was still in use in Russia to the end of the seventeenth century.") This calendar was used also in other areas of the Byzantine commonwealth such as Serbia — where it is found in old legal documents such as Dušan's Code and is thus called the Serbian calendar — and is currently still used in the Republic of Georgia alongside the Julian and Gregorian calendars. (Note: Colloquially referred to as the Georgian calendar or Sakartvelo calendar, but not to be confused with the globally-used Gregorian calendar.)

The calendar was based on the Julian calendar, except that the year started on 1 September and the year number used an Anno Mundi epoch derived from the Septuagint version of the Bible. It placed the date of creation at 5509 years before the incarnation of Jesus, and was characterized by a certain tendency that had already been a tradition among Jews and early Christians to number the years from the calculated foundation of the world (Latin: Annus Mundi or Ab Origine Mundi — "AM"). (Note: Significantly, this same phrase – "from the foundation of the world", or "since the dawn of time", (Greek: από καταβολής κόσμου, Apo Kataboles Kosmou) – occurs repeatedly in the New Testament, in Matthew 25:34, Luke 11:50, Hebrews 4:3, 9:26, and Revelation 13:8, 17:8. Anno Mundi eras may reflect a desire to use a convenient starting point for historical computation based on the Scriptures.) Its Year One, marking the assumed date of creation, was September 1, 5509 BC, to August 31, 5508 BC. This would make the current year 7535.

== History ==
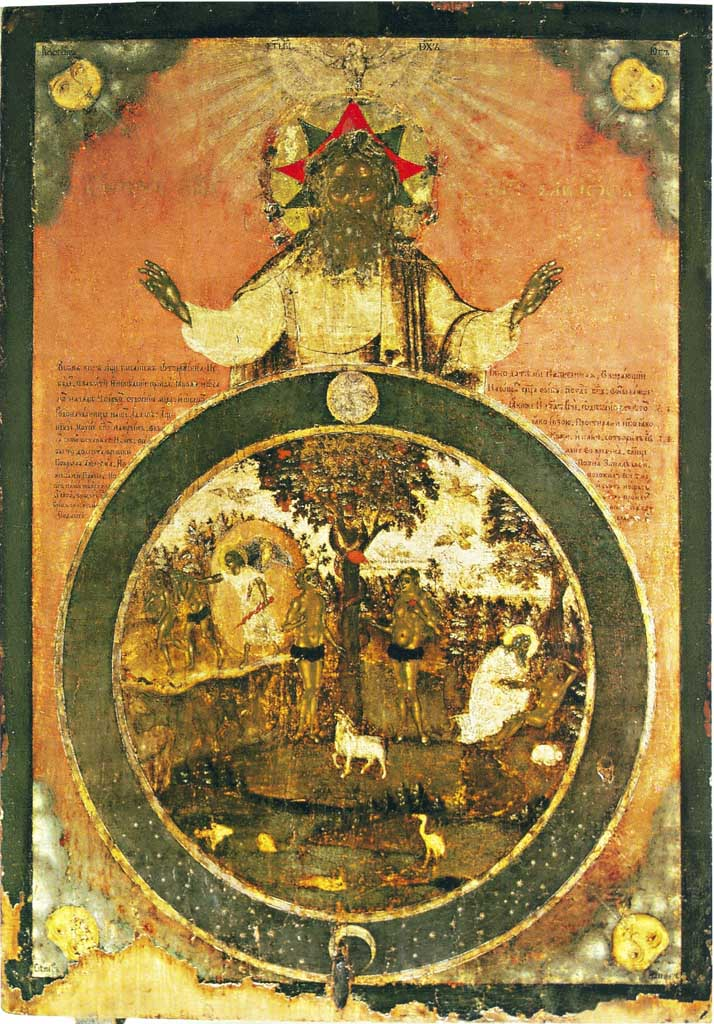
Creation of Adam and Eve (Russian icon, 18th c.)

The first appearance of the term is in the treatise of a monk and priest, Georgios (AD 638–639), who mentions all the main variants of the "World Era" in his work. Georgios argues that the main advantage of the World era is the common starting point of the astronomical lunar and solar cycles, and of the cycle of indictions, the usual dating system in Byzantium since the 6th century. He also regarded it as the most convenient for the Easter computus. For the details see the section "Tabular Byzantine calendar" below. Complex calculations of the 19-year lunar and 28-year solar cycles within this world era allowed scholars to attribute cosmic significance to certain historical dates, such as the birth or the crucifixion of Jesus.

This date underwent minor revisions before being finalized in the mid-7th century, although its precursors were developed c. AD 412. By the second half of the 7th century, the Creation Era was known in Western Europe, at least in Great Britain. (Note: PL XC, 598,877 (Pseudo‐Beda).) By the late 10th century (around AD 988), when the era appears in use on official government records, a unified system was widely recognized across the Eastern Roman world.

The era was ultimately calculated as starting on September 1, and Jesus was thought to have been born in the year 5509 since the creation of the world. (Note: "Although chronology is very ancient as a historical form, it developed greatly with the emergence of Christianity. It became an important vehicle of religious polemics, imposed and developed the chronological framework of the Bible with apologetic and polemic goals, and reached the very top of most cultivated historical forms. However, we are so permeated with the historiographical thought produced by nineteenth-century positivism that we have difficulties in recognising chronology as an important pre-modern form of historical writing using techniques, methods, and assumptions that can be seen as fundamental for the study of historiography.") Historical time was thus calculated from the creation, and not from Christ's birth as it was in the west after the Anno Domini system adopted between the 6th and 9th centuries. The eastern Church avoided the use of the Anno Domini system of Dionysius Exiguus, since the date of Christ's birth was debated in Constantinople as late as the 14th century.

The Byzantine calendar was identical to the Julian calendar except that:

- the names of the months were transcribed from Latin into Greek;
- the first day of the year was September 1, (Note: About the year 462 the Byzantine Indiction was moved from September 23 to September 1, where it remained throughout the rest of the Byzantine Empire, representing the present day beginning of the Church year. In 537 Justinian decreed that all dates must include the indiction, so it was officially adopted as one way to identify a Byzantine year, becoming compulsory.) so that both the ecclesiastical and civil calendar years ran from 1 September to 31 August, (see Indiction), which to the present day is the Eastern Orthodox church year;
- dates were seldom, if ever, reckoned according to the kalends (καλανδαί, kalandaí), nones (νωναί, nōnaí), and ides (εἰδοί, eidoí) of the months in the Roman manner, but simply numbered from the beginning of the month in the Greek, Syrian, and Egyptian manner, (Note: This differed from the status of the Greeks who lived in the Western Empire, who generally employed Roman-style dating even in their mother tongue.) (Note: On the occasions when the Byzantines did employ the Roman method of dating, they were in fact liable to misunderstand it and consider the "3rd of the kalends" to refer to the third day of the month rather than the day before the end of the prior month.) and,
- its era was based on the year of creation, reckoned September 1, 5509 BC, to August 31, 5508 BC, rather than the foundation of Rome; years were also reckoned by their place in the indiction and not by the years' consuls.

The leap day of the Byzantine calendar was obtained in an identical manner to the bissextile day of the original Roman version of the Julian calendar, by doubling the sixth day before the calends of March, i.e., by doubling 24 February.

The Byzantine World Era was gradually replaced in the Eastern Orthodox Church by the Christian Era (Anno Domini), which was utilized initially by Patriarch Theophanes I Karykes in 1597, afterwards by Patriarch Cyril Lucaris in 1626, and then formally established by the Church in 1728. Meanwhile, as Russia received Orthodox Christianity from Byzantium, it inherited the Orthodox calendar based on the Byzantine Era (translated into Slavonic). After the collapse of the Byzantine Empire in 1453, the era continued to be used by Russia, which witnessed millennialist movements in Moscow in AD 1492 (7000 AM). (Note: "According to Russian reckoning, 1492 marked the close of the seventh millennium of creation, and prophets and visionaries were getting enthusiastic or apprehensive, according to taste. Calendars stopped in 1492. There were skeptics, but they were officially disavowed, even persecuted. In 1490, the patriarch of Moscow conducted an inquisition against heretics, torturing his victims until they confessed to injudicious denunciations of the doctrine of the Trinity and the sanctity of the Sabbath. Among the proscribed thoughts of which the victims were accused was doubt about whether the world was really about to end.") It was only in AD 1700 that the Byzantine calendar in Russia was changed to the Julian calendar by Peter the Great. It still forms the basis of traditional Orthodox calendars up to today. September AD 2000 began the year 7509 AM. (Note: To convert our era to the Byzantine era, add 5509 years from September to December, and 5508 years from January to August.)

=== The age of the world ===
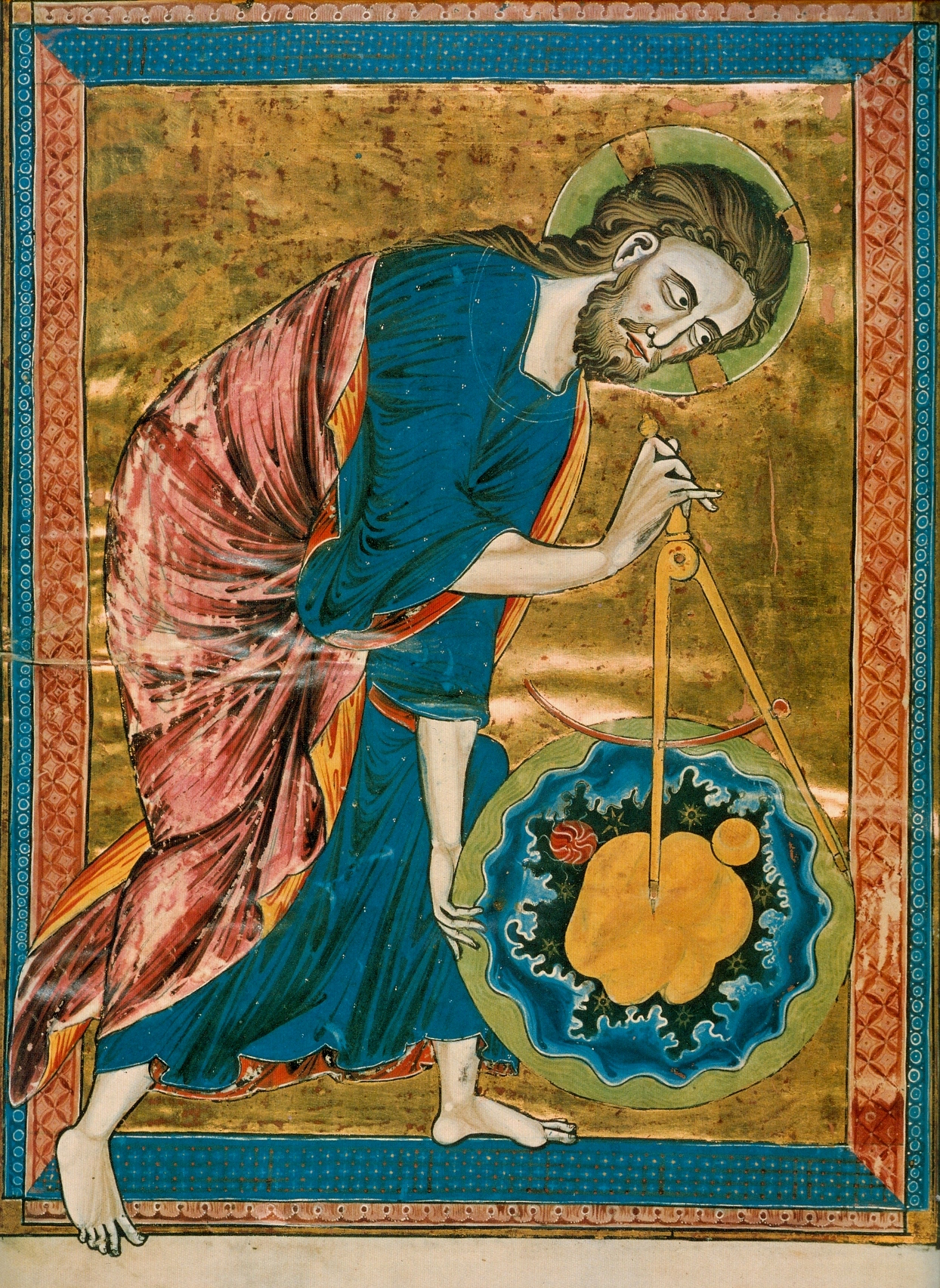
God as architect of the world (frontispiece of Bible moralisée, c. 1220–1230)

The earliest extant Christian writings on the age of the world according to the biblical chronology are by Theophilus (AD 115–181) in his apologetic work To Autolycus, and by Julius Africanus (AD 200–245) in his Five Books of Chronology. Both of these early Christian writers, following the Septuagint version of the Old Testament, determined the age of the world to have been about 5,530 years at the birth of Christ.

Ben Zion Wacholder points out that the writings of the Church Fathers on this subject are of vital significance (even though he disagrees with their chronological system based on the authenticity of the Septuagint, as compared to that of the Masoretic Text), in that through the Christian chronographers a window to the earlier Hellenistic biblical chronographers (Note: Eratosthenes of Cyrene (275-194 BC) represented contemporary Alexandrian scholarship; Eupolemus, a Palestinian Jew and a friend of Judah Maccabee, writing in 158 BC, is said to have been the first historian who synchronized Greek history in accordance with the theory of the Mosaic origin of culture. By the time of the 1st century BC, a world chronicle had synchronized Jewish and Greek history and had gained international circulation: Alexander Polyhistor (flourishing in 85-35 BC); Varro (116-27 BC); Ptolemy priest of Mendes (50 BC), who is cited by Tatian (Oratio ad Graecos, 38); Apion (1st century AD); Thrasyllus (before AD 36); and Thallus (1st century AD) – all cited chronicles which had incorporated the dates of the Noachite flood and the exodus.) is preserved:

An immense intellectual effort was expended during the Hellenistic period by both Jews and pagans to date creation, the flood, exodus, building of the Temple... In the course of their studies, men such as Tatian of Antioch (flourished in 180), Clement of Alexandria (died before 215), Hippolytus of Rome (died in 235), Julius Africanus of Jerusalem (died after 240), Eusebius of Caesarea in Palestine (260–340), and Pseudo-Justin frequently quoted their predecessors, the Graeco-Jewish biblical chronographers of the Hellenistic period, thereby allowing discernment of more distant scholarship.

The Hellenistic Jewish writer Demetrius the Chronographer (flourishing 221–204 BC) wrote On the Kings of Judea which dealt with biblical exegesis, mainly chronology; he computed the date of the flood and the birth of Abraham exactly as in the Septuagint, (Note: From the orthography of proper names, and from various expressions used, it is evident that Demetrius used the Septuagint text of the Bible.) and first established the Annus Adami (Era of Adam), the antecedent of the Hebrew World Era, and of the Alexandrian and Byzantine Creation Eras.

=== Alexandrian Era ===
The Alexandrian Era (Ancient Greek: Κόσμου ἔτη κατ’ Ἀλεξανδρεῖς, Kósmou étē kat'Alexandreîs) developed in AD 412, was the precursor to the Byzantine Era. After the initial attempts by Hippolytus, Clement of Alexandria and others, (Note: The "Era of Antioch" (5492 BC) and "Era of Alexandria" (5502 BC) were originally two different formations, differing by 10 years. They were both much in use by the early Christian writers attached to the Churches of Alexandria and Antioch. However after the year AD 284 the two eras coincided, settling on 5492 BC. There are, consequently, two distinct eras of Alexandria, the one being used before and the other after the accession of Diocletian.) the Alexandrian computation of the date of creation was worked out to be 25 March 5493 BC.

The Alexandrine monk Panodorus reckoned 5904 years from Adam to the year AD 412. His years began with August 29 (August 30 in the year preceding a leap year), corresponding to the First of Thoth, the Egyptian new year. Annianos of Alexandria however, preferred the Annunciation style as New Year's Day, 25 March, and shifted the Panodorus era by about six months, to begin on 25 March. This created the Alexandrian Era, whose first day was the first day of the proleptic (Note: A calendar obtained by extension earlier in time than its invention or implementation is called the proleptic version of the calendar.) Alexandrian civil year in progress, 29 August 5493 BC, with the ecclesiastical year beginning on 25 March 5493 BC.

This system presents in a masterly sort of way the mystical coincidence of the three main dates of the world's history: the beginning of Creation, the incarnation, and the Resurrection of Jesus Christ. All these events happened, according to the Alexandrian chronology, on 25 March; furthermore, the first two events were separated by the period of exactly 5500 years; the first and the third one occurred on Sunday — the sacred day of the beginning of the Creation and its renovation through Christ.

Dionysius of Alexandria had earlier emphatically quoted mystical justifications for the choice of March 25 as the start of the year:

March 25 was considered to be the anniversary of Creation itself. It was the first day of the year in the medieval Julian calendar and the nominal vernal equinox (it had been the actual equinox at the time when the Julian calendar was originally designed). Considering that Christ was conceived at that date turned March 25 into the Feast of the Annunciation which had to be followed, nine months later, by the celebration of the birth of Christ, Christmas, on December 25.

The Alexandrian Era of March 25, 5493 BC was adopted by church fathers such as Maximus the Confessor and Theophanes the Confessor, as well as chroniclers such as George Syncellus. Its striking mysticism made it popular in Byzantium, especially in monastic circles. However this masterpiece of Christian symbolism had two serious weak points: historical inaccuracy surrounding the date of the resurrection of Jesus as determined by its Easter computus, (Note: In the commonly used 19‐year Easter moon cycle, there was no year when the Passover (the first spring full moon, Nisan 14) would coincide with Friday and the traditional date of the Passion, March 25; according to Alexandrian system the date would have to have been Anno Mundi 5533 = 42(!)AD.) and its contradiction to the chronology of the Gospel of St John regarding the date of the crucifixion of Jesus on Friday after the Passover.

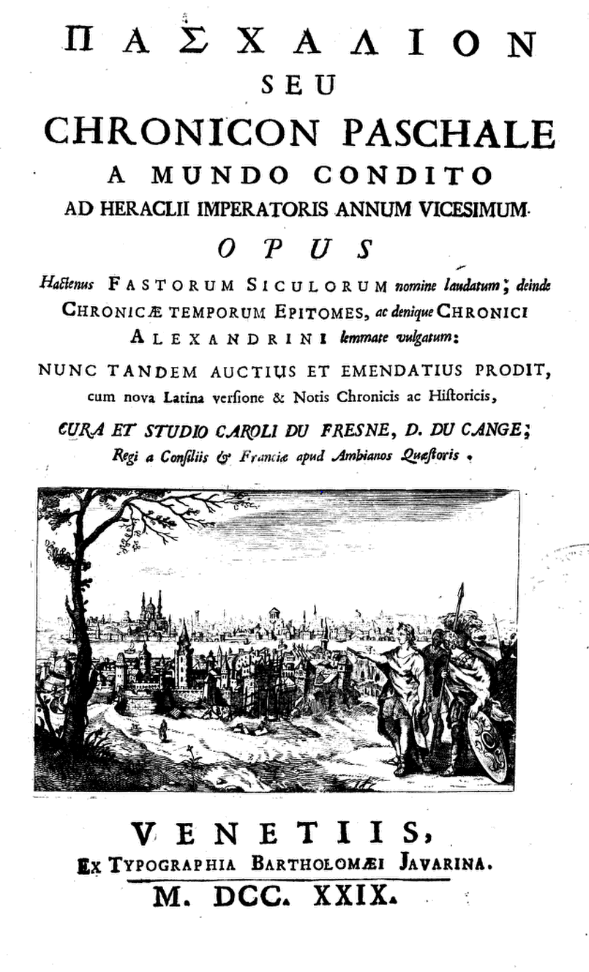
Chronicon Paschale, Venetian edition of 1729

=== Chronicon Paschale ===
A new variant of the World Era was suggested in the Chronicon Paschale, a valuable Byzantine universal chronicle of the world, composed about the year AD 630 by some representative of the Antiochian scholarly tradition. It had for its basis a chronological list of events extending from the creation of Adam to the year AD 627. The chronology of the writer is based on the figures of the Bible and begins with 21 March, 5507.

For its influence on Greek Christian chronology, and also because of its wide scope, the Chronicon Paschale takes its place beside Eusebius, and the chronicle of the monk Georgius Syncellus which was so important in the Middle Ages; but in respect of form it is inferior to these works.

By the late 10th century, the Byzantine Era, which had become fixed at September 1 5509 BC since at least the mid-7th century (differing by 16 years from the Alexandrian date, and 2 years from the Chronicon Paschale), had become the widely accepted calendar of choice par excellence for Chalcedonian Orthodoxy.

== Accounts in Church Fathers ==
John Chrysostom says in his Homily "On the Cross and the Thief", that Christ "opened for us today Paradise, which had remained closed for some 5000 years."

Isaac the Syrian writes in a Homily that before Christ "for five thousand years five hundred and some years God left Adam (i.e. man) to labor on the earth."

Augustine of Hippo writes in the City of God (written AD 413–426):

"Let us omit the conjectures of men who know not what they say when they speak of the nature and origin of the human race...They are deceived by those highly mendacious documents which profess to give the history of many thousands of years, though reckoning by the sacred writings we find that not 6,000 years have passed. (City of God 12:10)."

Augustine goes on to say that the ancient Greek chronology "does not exceed the true account of the duration of the world as it is given in our documents (i.e. the Scriptures), which are truly sacred."

Hippolytus of Rome (c. 170–235) maintained on Scriptural grounds that Jesus's birth took place in AM 5500, and held that the birth of Christ took place on a passover day, deducing that its month-date was 25 March (see Alexandrian Era). He gave the following intervals:

"...from Adam to the flood 2242 years, thence to Abraham 1141 years, thence to the Exodus 430 years, thence to the passover of Joshua 41 years, thence to the passover of Hezekiah 864 years, thence to the passover of Josiah 114 years, thence to the passover of Ezra 107 years, and thence to the birth of Christ 563 years."

In his Commentary on Daniel, one of his earlier writings, he proceeds to set out additional reasons for accepting the date of AM 5500:

"First he quotes Exod. xxv. 10f. and pointing out that the length, breadth and height of the ark of the covenant amount in all to 5½ cubits, says that these symbolize the 5,500 years from Adam at the end of which the Saviour was born. He then quotes from Jn. xix. 14 ' it was about the sixth hour ' and, understanding by that 5½ hours, takes each hour to correspond to a thousand years of the world's life..."

Around AD 202 Hippolytus held that Jesus was born in the 42nd year of the reign of Augustus and that he was born in AM 5500. (Note: It is likely that his reckoning is from 43 BC, the year in which Octavian was declared consul by senate and people and recognized as the adopted son and heir of Caesar. Epiphanius, (Haeres) also puts Jesus's birth in the 42nd year of Augustus when Octavius Augustus xiii and Silanus were consuls; and they were consuls in 2 BC.) In his Commentary on Daniel he did not need to establish the precise year of Jesus's birth; he is not concerned about the day of the week, the month-date, or even the year; it was sufficient for his purpose to show that Christ was born in the days of Augustus in AM 5500.

== Accounts in Byzantine authors ==
From Justinian's decree in AD 537 that all dates must include the Indiction, the unification of the theological date of creation (as yet unfinalized) with the administrative system of Indiction cycles became commonly referred to amongst Byzantine authors, to whom the indiction was the standard measurement of time.

=== In official documents ===
In the year AD 691, we find the Creation Era in the Acts of the Quinisext Council:

... as of the fifteenth day of the month of January last past, in the last fourth Indiction, in the year six thousand one hundred and ninety"

We find the era also in the dating of the so-called Letter of three Patriarchs to the emperor Theophilos (April, indiction 14, 6344 = AD 836).

By the 10th century the Byzantine Era is found in the Novellas of AD 947, 962, 964, and most surely of the year AD 988, all dated in this way, as well as the Act of Patriarch Nicholaos II Chrysobergos in AD 987.

John Skylitzes' (c. 1081–1118) major work is the Synopsis of Histories, which covers the reigns of the Byzantine emperors from the death of Nicephorus I in 811 to the deposition of Michael IV in 1057; it continues the chronicle of Theophanes the Confessor. Quoting from him as an example of the common Byzantine dating method, he refers to emperor Basil, writing that:

In the year 6508 [1000], in the thirteenth indiction, the emperor sent a great force against the Bulgarian fortified positions (kastra) on the far side of the Balkan (Haimos) mountains,..."

Niketas Choniates (c. 1155–1215), sometimes called Acominatus, was a Byzantine Greek historian. His chief work is his History, in twenty-one books, of the period from 1118 to 1207. Again, an example of the dating method can be seen as he refers to the fall of Constantinople to the fourth crusade as follows:

The queen of cities fell to the Latins on the twelfth day of the month of April of the seventh indiction in the year 6712 [1204]."

The historian Doukas, writing c. AD 1460, makes a detailed account for the Creation Era. Although unrefined in style, the history of Doukas is both judicious and trustworthy, and it is the most valuable source for the closing years of the Byzantine empire.

From Adam, the first man created by God, to Noah, at whose time the flood took place, there were ten generations. The first, which was from God, was that of Adam. The second, after 230 years, was that of Seth begotten of Adam. The third, 205 years after Seth, was that of Enos begotten of Seth. The fourth, 190 years after Enos, was that of Kainan begotten of Enos. The fifth, 170 years after Kainan, was that of Mahaleel begotten of Kainan. The sixth, 165 years after Mahaleel, was that of Jared begotten of Mahaleel. The seventh, 162 years after Jared, was that of Enoch begotten of Jared. The eighth, 165 years after Enoch, was that of Methuselah begotten of Enoch. The ninth, 167 years after Methuselah, was that of Lamech begotten of Methuselah. The tenth, 188 years after Lamech, was that of Noah. Noah was 600 years old when the flood of water came upon the earth. Thus 2242 years may be counted from Adam to the flood.

There are also ten generations from the flood to Abraham numbering 1121 years. Abraham was seventy-five years old when he moved to the land of Canaan from Mesopotamia, and having resided there twenty-five years he begat Isaac. Isaac begat two sons, Esau and Jacob. When Jacob was 130 years old he went to Egypt with his twelve sons and grandchildren, seventy-five in number. And Abraham with his offspring dwelt in the land of Canaan 433 years, and having multiplied they numbered twelve tribes; a multitude of 600,000 were reckoned from the twelve sons of Jacob whose names are as follows: Ruben, Symeon, Levi, Judah, Issachar, Zebulun, Naphtali, Gad, Asher, Dan, Joseph, and Benjamin.

The descendants of Levi were Moses and Aaron; the latter was the first of the priesthood while Moses was appointed to govern. In the eightieth year of his life, he walked through the Red Sea and led his people out of Egypt. This Moses flourished in the time of Inachos [son of Oceanus and King of Argos] who was the first [Greek] king to reign. Thus the Jews are more ancient than the Greeks.

Remaining in the wilderness forty years they were governed for twenty-five years by Joshua, son of Nun, and by the Judges for 454 years to the reign of Saul, the first king installed by them. During the first year of his reign, the great David was born. Thus from Abraham to David fourteen generations are numbered for a total of 1024 years. From David to the deportation to Babylon [586 BC] there are fourteen generations totaling 609 years. From the Babylonian Captivity to Christ there are fourteen generations totaling 504 years.

By the sequence of Numbers we calculate the number of 5,500 years from the time of the first Adam to Christ.

== Byzantine mindset ==
=== Literal creation days ===
Even the most mystical Fathers such as St. Isaac the Syrian accepted without question the common understanding of the Church that the world was created "more or less" in 5,500 BC. As Fr. Seraphim Rose points out:

"The Holy Fathers (probably unanimously) certainly have no doubt that the chronology of the Old Testament, from Adam onwards, is to be accepted "literally." They did not have the fundamentalist's over-concern for chronological precision, but even the most mystical Fathers (St. Isaac the Syrian, St. Gregory Palamas, etc.) were quite certain that Adam lived literally some 900 years, that there were some 5,500 years ("more or less") between the creation and the Birth of Christ."

For early Christians, the creation of the world was neither a matter of dogma nor a cosmological problem. As part of a history centered on Man, it was a divine act whose reality was beyond any doubt.

=== Hours of the liturgical day ===
In the Byzantine period, the day was divided into two 12-hour cycles fixed by the rising and setting of the sun.

"Following Roman custom, the Byzantines began their calendrical day (nychthemeron) at midnight with the first hour of day (hemera) coming at dawn. The third hour marked midmorning, the sixth hour noon, and the ninth hour midafternoon. Evening (hespera) began at the 11th hour, and with sunset came the first hour of night (apodeipnon). The interval between sunset and sunrise (nyx) was similarly divided into 12 hours as well as the traditional "watches" (vigiliae) of Roman times."

=== Days of the liturgical week ===
Marcus Rautman points out that the seven-day week was known throughout the ancient world. The Roman Calendar had assigned one of the planetary deities to each day of the week. The Byzantines naturally avoided using these Latin names with their pagan echoes. They began their week with the "Lord's Day" (Kyriake), followed by an orderly succession of numbered days: Deutera ("2nd"), Trite ("3rd"), Tetarte ("4th"), and Pempte ("5th"), a day of "preparation" (Paraskeve), and finally Sabatton.

Each day was devoted to remembering one event of the life of Christ or the Theotokos or several martyrs or saints, whose observed feast days gradually eclipsed traditional festivals. Kyriake was seen as the day of resurrection of Christ and as both the first and eighth day of the week, in the same way that Christ was the alpha and omega of the cosmos, existing both before and after time. The second day of the week recognized angels, "the secondary luminaries as the first reflections of the primal outpouring of light", just as the sun and the moon had been observed during the Roman week. John the Baptist, the forerunner (Prodromos) of Christ, was honored on the third day. Both the second and third days were viewed as occasions for penitence. The fourth and sixth days were dedicated to the Cross. The fourth day to the Theotokos and her mourning of the loss of her son and the sixth day (the Paraskeue) as the day of the Crucifixion of the Lord, with holy songs sung and fasting in remembrance of these events. St. Nicholas was honored on the fifth day of the week, while the Sabatton day was set aside for the saints and all the deceased faithful. This order is still in use in the Orthodox Church and the Eastern Catholic Churches.

A special arrangement of the way in which the hymns were sung was set for each day of the eight-week cycle, the "Octoechos (liturgy)". This cycle begins on the first Sunday after Easter ("Thomas-Sunday") and contains the texts whose content represents the meaning of the days of the week. The hymns sung on these eight weeks were performed with the use of eight different modes also called Octoechoi.

== Historical perspective and cognitive framework ==
- According to the Orthodox Study Bible:
  Regarding questions about the scientific accuracy of the Genesis account of creation, and about various viewpoints concerning evolution, the Eastern Orthodox Church has not dogmatized any particular view. What is dogmatically proclaimed is that the One Triune God created everything that exists, and that man was created in a unique way and is alone made in the image and likeness of God (Gn 1:26,27).
  The opening words of the Nicene Creed, the central doctrinal statement of Christianity, affirms that the One True God is the source of everything that exists, both physical and spiritual, both animate and inanimate: "We believe in one God, the Father Almighty, Maker of Heaven and Earth, and of all things visible and invisible." In addition, our regeneration in Christ and the resurrection of the dead are both often called the "New Creation" (2 Cor 5:17; Rev 21:1).
- The most extensive and influential recent compilation in English of the writings and mindset of the early Church Fathers on Orthodox-Byzantine calendar and biblical chronography is found in the book "Genesis, Creation, and Early Man: The Orthodox Christian Vision," based on the work of the American hieromonk Fr. Seraphim Rose, edited by Abbot Damascene Christiansen, the second edition of which was published in 2011. It presents the patristic view of the "six days" as actual days, together with views of revered figures in world Orthodoxy who hold this view through modern times. Based on the patristic view, the book presents how in Orthodoxy the nature of time and space before the Fall is a mystery that cannot be known, and that this upholds both the Byzantine view and a distinction by which the Orthodox mindset does not seek to rationally understand the situation of man before the Fall, including chronology, unlike some Protestant Creationists. Yet Fr. Seraphim did find aspects of modern Protestant Creationist and "Intelligent Design" criticisms of contemporary Western scientific views of creation helpful in questioning the universal cultural assumptions of that science, which limited in his view the experiential grasp of spiritual reality found in non-Western Orthodox Christian teachings and experience. A recent summary of Fr. Seraphim Rose's work was given by the American Orthodox Christian priest and environmental literature scholar Paul Siewers.
- According to Fr. Stanley Harakas, the Bible's description of creation is not a "scientific account". It is not read for scientific knowledge but for spiritual truth and divine revelation. The physical-scientific side of the origins of mankind, though important, is really quite secondary in significance to the Church's message. The central image of Adam as God's image and likeness, who also represents fallen and sinful humanity, and the new Adam, Jesus Christ, who is the "beginning", the first-born of the dead (Colossians 1:18) and the "first-fruits" of those who were dead, and are now alive (1 Corinthians 15:20–23), is what is really important.
- Protopresbyter Doru Costache affirms in "The Orthodox Doctrine of Creation in the Age of Science" (2019), that Orthodox Christianity has never issued a dogma of creation that establishes in normative terms its relevant convictions, even though it does possess a strong sense of the cosmos, developing a theology of the world. While not specifically discussing the chronology of the Byzantine calendar as such, he explains that the Orthodox doctrine of creation is largely compatible with the contemporary scientific representation of reality, also suggesting that the Christian doctrine of creation should preserve its capacity to be redrafted when the cultural environment changes. He states that modern creationism has originated in milieus that are foreign to the Orthodox worldview, and there is no record of a wholesale rejection of culture in the patristic tradition. Rather, from the outset of its historical emergence, Orthodox theology has traditionally interacted with the available sciences and the cultural frameworks of the past. The ongoing contextualization, particularly in relation to scientific culture, remained the norm for most of the Byzantine era, which was a time of prodigious research, cultural cross pollination, and innovation. In contrast with contemporary creationism, which construes a recently made world, molded exclusively by God out of an inert matter deprived of natural energy and capacity for movement, the Orthodox theology of creation traditionally advocates a distinction between the divine acts of creation, and organization. He argues that the supernaturalist worldview of creationism was discarded indirectly by the Orthodox Church in the seventh century as monoenergism. Thus he aligns with the view of an expanding universe whose history began billions of years ago, a universe characterized by homogeneity, movement, change, and complexity.
- Postdoctoral researcher Alexander V. Khramov (Ph.D.) examines the relationship between Christian faith and evolutionary theory in "Fitting Evolution into Christian Belief: An Eastern Orthodox Approach" (2017). In defining the basic cognitive framework by which we are to approach this subject, he begins by noting that those who have striven to reconcile one system with the other have usually resorted to theistic evolution (TE) almost without exception – the idea that God employed an evolutionary process to create the Universe and living things. However, if we look instead at the problem from the point of view of Greek patristic thought, we see a very different way of fitting evolution into Christian belief. By referring to the writings of the Church Fathers including Gregory of Nyssa and Gregory the Theologian, he states that what matters most is not the process of creation, but rather how the Church Fathers understood its result. The basic premise described is that God did not create humans in their present bodily condition; but rather prelapsarian human beings (i.e. before the Fall of man) had spiritual bodies and lived a kind of angelic life; humans entered the organismic life and entered 'time' itself only after the Fall, which happened before the beginning of the empirically known universe. Therefore, it is entirely reasonable to suppose that evolution itself started in the fallen world; and Theistic evolutionists have no warrant to equate the earliest members of Homo sapiens with those humans who were created by God on the sixth day for life in paradise. The six days of creation and other events preceding the expulsion from Paradise simply lie beyond what science can discover. So "Moses's Book" possesses its own truth, independent of what scientists can say about the observable world. There can be no reason for conflict.
- Fr. Arsenius John Baptist Vuibert (S.S.), a 19th-century historian, observed that Biblical Chronologies are uncertain due to discrepancies in the figures in Genesis and other methodological factors, accounting for hundreds of different chronologies being assigned by historians. In the case of the Fathers of the Sixth Ecumenical Council, who assigned 5509 BC. as the date of the creation of man, he writes that it was in response to the emperor's wishes to fix an era or convenient starting point for historical computation. Therefore, it was a decision of mere historical convenience, not respecting either faith or morals, which are what is truly of intrinsic value in the Scriptures. Having made this disclaimer, he settles on the Benedictine Chronology of 4963 BC for the purposes of his history.
- According to the ninth edition of the Encyclopædia Britannica, regarding the so-called Era of the Creation of the World, Alphonse Des Vignoles asserted in the preface to his Chronologie de l’Histoire Sainte (Chronology of Sacred History, Berlin 1738), that he collected upwards of two-hundred different calculations, the shortest of which reckons only 3483 years between the creation of the world and the commencement of the vulgar era and the longest 6984. The so-called era of the creation of the world is therefore a purely conventional and arbitrary epoch, for which the very nature of the case discussion is hopeless labour.
- It may also be noted historically that while Byzantine officials and chroniclers were disconcerted by the ambiguities among the different dating and recording systems in the earlier centuries, these mattered little to most people who marked time by the orderly progression of agricultural seasons and church festivals, and by the regularity of holidays, weather cycles, and years that revealed the Divine order (Taxis) underlying the world.

== Summary ==
As the Greek and Roman methods of computing time were connected with certain pagan rites and observances, Christians began at an early period to adopt the Hebrew practice of reckoning their years from the supposed period of the creation of the world.

Currently the two dominant dates for creation that exist using the biblical model are about 5500 BC and about 4000 BC. These are calculated from the genealogies in two versions of the Bible, with most of the difference arising from two versions of Genesis. The older dates of the Church Fathers in the Byzantine Era and in its precursor, the Alexandrian Era, are based on the Greek Septuagint. The later dates of the Ussher chronology and the Hebrew calendar are based on the Hebrew Masoretic Text.

The Fathers were well aware of the discrepancy of some hundreds of years between the Greek and Hebrew Old Testament chronology, (Note: Note that according to Wacholder, Josephus' chronology for the antediluvian period (pre-flood) conforms with the LXX, but for the Noachites (post-flood) he used the Hebrew text. He chose this method to resolve the problem of the two chronological systems.) and it did not bother them; they did not quibble over years or worry that the standard calendar was precise "to the very year"; it is sufficient that what is involved is beyond any doubt a matter of some few thousands of years, involving the lifetimes of specific men, and it can in no way be interpreted as millions of years or whole ages and races of men.

To this day, traditional Orthodox Christians will use the Byzantine calculation of the World Era in conjunction with the Anno Domini (AD) year. Both dates appear on Orthodox cornerstones, ecclesiastical calendars and formal documents. The ecclesiastical new year is still observed on September 1 (or on the Gregorian calendar's September 14 for those churches which follow the Julian calendar). September 2025 marked the beginning of the year 7534 of this era.

== Tabular Byzantine calendar ==
The tabular Byzantine calendar is used to calculate the date of Easter. It dates back to AD 284, when the new moon fell on the fifth epagemonal day of the Alexandrian calendar (28 August). Eusebius (vii.32) recounts that Anatolius of Laodicea was the first to arrange the 19-years cycle (when the new moon returns to the same Julian date) for ecclesiastical purposes. Anatolius says that he places the new moon of the first year of his cycle on the Alexandrian equivalent of 22 March, the day of the vernal equinox. In the Julian calendar, the equinox recedes at the rate of 1 day in 128 years; by the time of the First Council of Nicaea in AD 325 it was falling on 21 March. 22 March is 26 Phamenoth in the Alexandrian calendar.

The lunar new year was not allowed to begin before 15 Thoth (12 September, or 13 September if the following February has 29 days), and the month in which Easter fell was not allowed to begin before 12 Phamenoth (8 March). As the paschal full moon (the full moon before Easter), like all full moons is assigned to the 14th day of the lunar month, its earliest date was thus 25 Phamenoth (21 March), and Easter fell at earliest on 26 Phamenoth (22 March) and at latest on 30 Pharmouthi (25 April). The month in which Easter fell could thus begin no later than 10 Pharmouthi (5 April) and the Easter full moon could fall no later than 18 April (23 Pharmouthi).

If, at the end of the twelfth lunar month, the next lunar month would begin before 15 Thoth, an additional 30-day month was inserted. This caused Easter to jump forward in years 3, 6, 9, 11, 14, 17 and 19 of the cycle. The lunar date of the sixth epagemonal day (considered the first day of a leap year) was the same as that of the previous day. The Alexandrian months, all of thirty days, are:

1. Thoth
2. Phaophi
3. Athyr
4. Choiac
5. Tybi
6. Mechir
7. Phamenoth
8. Pharmouthi
9. Pachom
10. Payni
11. Epiphi
12. Mesore

The first lunar month had 29 days, and following lunar months had 30 and 29 days alternately. Thus the sixth lunar month, preceding the one in which Easter fell, had 30 days, minimising the chance of Easter clashing with Passover. This calendar uses the Callippic cycle of 76 years, under which the lunar year averages 365.25 days. But with this arrangement the lunar year averages 366.25 days. Therefore, in cycle 19, when the eleventh lunar month began on 7 Mesore and had 29 days, the next month (beginning on 1 Thoth) also had 29 days (saltus lunae) and the first month of the new lunar year began on 30 Thoth. In the sixth century, after it accepted that it no longer mattered if the birthday of Rome (23 April) fell within Lent, the Roman church abandoned its own calculation (the Supputatio Romana) for the Alexandrian one. This involved recasting the lunar months so that their first days were given in terms of the Julian calendar. While Easter continued to jump forward in years 3, 6, 8, 11, 14, 17 and 19 of the cycle the extra months were more equitably spaced, generally being hidden within those Julian months which contained two new moons. Their starting dates were:

Cycle 3: 1 January
Cycle 5: 2 September
Cycle 8: 6 March
Cycle 11: 3 January
Cycle 13: 31 December
Cycle 16: 1 September
Cycle 19: 5 March

== See also ==
- Book of Genesis
- Byzantine time
- Chronology of the Bible
- Dating creation
- Creatio ex nihilo
- Hexameron

Other Judeo-Christian eras

- Coptic calendar (Note that the Alexandrian Era (March 25, 5493 BC), is totally distinct from the Coptic "Alexandrian Calendar", which is derived from the ancient Egyptian calendar and based on another era, the Era of the Martyrs (August 29, 284).)
- Enoch calendar
- Ethiopian calendar (Derived from the Coptic "Alexandrian Calendar", and based on the Incarnation Era (August 29, AD 8).)
- Hebrew calendar
- Ussher chronology
- Greek culture

== Bibliography and further reading ==
=== Primary sources ===
- Doukas. Decline and Fall of Byzantium To The Ottoman Turks. An Annotated Translation by Harry J. Magoulias. Wayne State University Press, 1975.
- Synkellos, George (2002). The chronography of George Synkellos: a Byzantine chronicle of universal history from the creation. Translated by Adler, William; Tuffin, Paul. Oxford University Press. ISBN 978-0-19-924190-3.
- Ibn Ezra, Abraham ben Meïr, (1092–1167). Ibn Ezra's Commentary on the Pentateuch: Genesis (Bereshit). (Vol.1 – Genesis). Transl. and annotated by H. Norman Strickman & Arthur M. Silver. Menorah Pub. Co., New York, N.Y., 1988.
- Julius Africanus. Extant Writings III. The Extant Fragments of the Five Books of the Chronography of Julius Africanus.
- Niketas Choniates. O City of Byzantium, Annals of Niketas Choniates. Transl. by Harry J. Magoulias. Wayne State University Press, Detroit, 1984.
- Pliny the Elder. Historia Naturalis, XVIII, 210.
- St. Basil the Great. Hexæmeron. Nicene and Post-Nicene Fathers of the Christian Church, 2nd Series (NPNF2). Transl. Philip Schaff, D.D., LL.D. (1819–1893): Volume VIII – Basil: Letters and Select Works. Wm. B. Eerdmans Publishing Co., Grand Rapids, Michigan.
- St. Hilary of Poitiers. On the Trinity. Book IV.
- The Rudder (Pedalion): Comp. Hieromonk Agapius and monk Nicodemus. First printed and published 1800. Trans. D. Cummings, [from the 5th edition published by John Nicolaides (Kesisoglou the Caesarian) in Athens, Greece in 1908], Chicago: The Orthodox Christian Educational Society, 1957. Repr., New York, N.Y.: Luna Printing Co., 1983.
- Theophanes. The Chronicle of Theophanes Confessor: Byzantine and Near Eastern History, AD 284–813. Cyril Mango, Roger Scott, Geoffrey Greatrex (Eds.). Oxford University Press, 1997.
- Theophilus of Antioch. Theophilus of Antioch to Autolycus. Book III. Chap XXIV (Chronology from Adam) – Chap. XXVIII (Leading Chronological Epochs).

=== Secondary sources ===
21st century

- Anthony Bryer. "Chronology and Dating". In: Elizabeth Jeffreys, John Haldon, Robin Cormack . The Oxford Handbook of Byzantine Studies. Oxford University Press, 2008. pp. 31–37.
- Iaakov Karcz. "Implications of some early Jewish sources for estimates of earthquake hazard in the Holy Land". Annals of Geophysics, Vol. 47, N. 2/3, April/June 2004.
- Pavel Kuzenkov. How old is the World? The Byzantine era κατα Ρωμαίους and its rivals. 21st International Congress of Byzantine Studies, London 2006.
- Charles Ellis. "Russian Calendar (988–1917)". The Literary Encyclopedia. 25 September 2008.
- Rautman, Marcus Louis (2006). Daily life in the Byzantine Empire. Greenwood Press. pp. 3–8. ISBN 978-0-313-32437-6.
- Roger T. Beckwith. Calendar, Chronology, and Worship: Studies in Ancient Judaism and Early Christianity. Brill Academic Publishers, 2005. (Beckwith served for twenty years on the Anglican-Orthodox Commission).
- The Orthodox Study Bible. St. Athanasius Academy of Orthodox Theology. Elk Grove, California, 2008.

20th century

- Barry Setterfield. Ancient Chronology in Scripture. September 1999.
- Chisholm, Hugh, ed. (1911). "Chronology" . Encyclopædia Britannica. Vol. 6 (11th ed.). Cambridge University Press. pp. 305–318.
- Ben Zion Wacholder. "Biblical Chronology in the Hellenistic World Chronicles". in The Harvard Theological Review, Vol.61, No.3 (Jul., 1968), pp. 451–481.
- Ben Zion Wacholder. Essays on Jewish Chronology and Chronography. Ktav Pub. House, 1976.
- E.G. Richards. Mapping Time: The Calendar and its History. Oxford University Press, 1998.
- Elias J. Bickerman. Chronology of the Ancient World. 2nd edition. Cornell University Press. 1980.
- Fr. Stanley S. Harakas. The Orthodox Church: 455 Questions and Answers. Light & Life Publishing, Minneapolis, 1988.
- George Ogg. "Hippolytus and the Introduction of the Christian Era". in Vigiliae Christianae, Vol.16, No.1 (Mar., 1962), pp. 2–18.
- Howlett, J. "Biblical Chronology". In The Catholic Encyclopedia (New Advent). New York: Robert Appleton Company, 1908.
- Jack Finegan. Handbook of Biblical Chronology: Principles of Time Reckoning in the Ancient World and Problems of Chronology in the Bible. Hendrickson Publishers, 1998.
- William Adler. Time Immemorial: Archaic History and its Sources in Christian Chronography from Julius Africanus to George Syncellus. Washington, D.C. : Dumbarton Oaks Research Library and Collection, 1989.
- K.A. Worp. Chronological Observations on Later Byzantine Documents. 1985. University of Amsterdam.
- Foss, Clive. "Three Apparent Early Examples of the Era of Creation". Zeitschrift für Papyrologie und Epigraphik, Bd. 31 (1978), pp. 241–246.
- Roger S. Bagnall, K. A. Worp. The Chronological Systems of Byzantine Egypt. Zutphen, 1978.
- V. Grumel. La Chronologie. Presses Universitaires France, Paris. 1958.
- Rev. Philip Schaff (1819–1893), Ed. "Era." Schaff-Herzog Encyclopedia of Religious Knowledge New Edition, 13 Vols., 1908–14. Vol. 4, pp. 163.
- Van der Essen, L. "Chronicon Paschale". In The Catholic Encyclopedia (New Advent). New York: Robert Appleton Company, 1908.
- Yiannis E. Meimaris. Chronological Systems in Roman-Byzantine Palestine and Arabia. Athens, 1992.
- Otto Neugebauer, Ethiopic astronomy and computus (Vienna, 1979).

19th century and earlier

- John McClintock, James Strong. Cyclopedia of Biblical, theological, and ecclesiastical literature: Supplement. V.2. Harper, 1887.
- Fr. Arsenius John Baptist Vuibert (S.S.). An Ancient History: From the Creation to the Fall of the Western Empire in A.D. 476. Baltimore: Foley, 1886.
- Samuel Poznański. "Ben Meir and the Origin of the Jewish Calendar". in The Jewish Quarterly Review, Vol. 10, No. 1 (Oct., 1897), pp. 152–161.
- Sir Thomas Browne. Pseudodoxia Epidemica: Book VI. Ch. 1 – Of sundry common opinions Cosmographical and Historical. 1646; 6th ed., 1672. pp. 321–330.
- The Popular Encyclopedia: being a general dictionary of arts, sciences, literature, biography, history, and political economy. (Vol. 3, Part 1). Glasgow: Blackie and Son, 1841.
- Thomas Spencer Baynes. "Chronology: Era of the Creation of the World.” The Encyclopædia Britannica: a dictionary of arts, sciences, and general literature. 9th Ed., Vol. 5. A. & C. Black, 1833. pp. 709–754.

:This article incorporates text from Byzantine Creation Era at OrthodoxWiki which is licensed under the CC-BY-SA and GFDL.
