= Anno Mundi =

Calendar era based on the biblical account of creation

Today (at UTC+00)
- Monday, 29 June 2026
- Hebrew: 14 Tammuz, AM 5786
- Julian: 16 June, AD 2026 (AM 7534)
Other calendars
Armenian	14 Hrotich 1475
Bengali	15 Asharh, BS 1433
Chinese	Yang Wood Dog・Heart Mansion; 15 Wǔyuè, Bǐngwǔnián (Xiazhi, 8 days until Xiaoshu)
Common Era	29 June 2026 CE
Coptic	22 Paoni, AM 1742
Egyptian	14 Athyr, NE 2775
Ethiopian	22 Sanē, AD 2018
French Republican	Décade II, Primidi de Messidor de l'Année 234 de la République
Gregorian	29 June, AD 2026
Islamic	13 Muharram, AH 1448 (tabular method)
ISO week date	2026-W27-1
Japanese	15 Satsuki, Reiwa 8 (Geshi, 8 days until Shōsho)
Julian day	2461221
Maya	13.0.13.12.18; 11 Tzec, 2 Etznab
Roman	ante diem XVI Kalendas Iulias, AUC 2779
Solar Hijri	8 Tir, SH 1405

Anno Mundi (from Latin 'in the year of the world'; Hebrew: לבריאת העולם, romanized: Livryat haOlam, lit. 'to the creation of the world'), abbreviated as AM or A.M., or Year After Creation, is a calendar era based on biblical accounts of the creation of the world and subsequent history. Two such calendar eras of notable use are:

- Since the Middle Ages, the Hebrew calendar has been based on rabbinic calculations of the year of creation from the Hebrew Masoretic Text of the Bible. This calendar is used within Jewish communities for religious purposes and is one of two official calendars in Israel. In the Hebrew calendar, the day begins at sunset. The calendar's epoch, corresponding to the calculated date of the world's creation, is equivalent to sunset on the proleptic Julian calendar date 6 October 3761 BCE. The new year begins at Rosh Hashanah, in Tishrei. Anno Mundi 5786 (meaning the 5,786th year since the creation of the world) began at sunset on September 22, 2025, according to the Gregorian calendar.
- The Creation Era of Constantinople was observed by Christian communities within the Eastern Roman Empire as part of the Byzantine calendar and retained by Eastern Orthodoxy until 1728. Its Year One, marking the assumed date of creation, was September 1, 5509 BC, to August 31, 5508 BC. This would make the current year (AD 2026) 7534 (7535 after September 1).

While both eras reputedly begin with the creation of the world, their disparity in epoch lies in the biblical texts chosen to infer a year of creation. According to the Septuagint, the Earth seems to have been created roughly around 5500 BCE, and about 3760 BCE based on the Hebrew Masoretic text. Most of the 1,732-year difference resides in numerical discrepancies in the genealogies of the two versions of the Book of Genesis. Patriarchs from Adam to Terah, the father of Abraham, are said to be older by 100 years or more when they begat their named son in the Septuagint than they were in the Latin Vulgate, or the Hebrew Tanakh. The net difference between the two major genealogies of Genesis is 1,466 years (ignoring the "second year after the flood" ambiguity), 85% of the total difference. (See Dating creation.)

There are also discrepancies between methods of dating based on the text of the Bible vs. modern academic dating of landmark events used to calibrate year counts, such as the destruction of the First Temple—see Missing years (Jewish calendar).

== Jewish tradition ==
In Hebrew, Anno Mundi years are labeled "to [in] the creation of the world" (לבריאת העולם), while in English they are abbreviated AM or A.M.. Occasionally, Anno Mundi is styled as Anno Hebraico (AH), though this is subject to confusion with notation for the Islamic Hijri year. The Jewish Anno Mundi count is sometimes referred to as the "Hebrew era", to distinguish it from other systems such as the Byzantine calendar (which uses a different calculation of the year since creation. Thus, adding 3760 before Rosh Hashanah or 3761 after to a Julian calendar year number starting from 1 CE will yield the Hebrew year. For earlier years there may be a discrepancy; see Missing years (Jewish calendar).

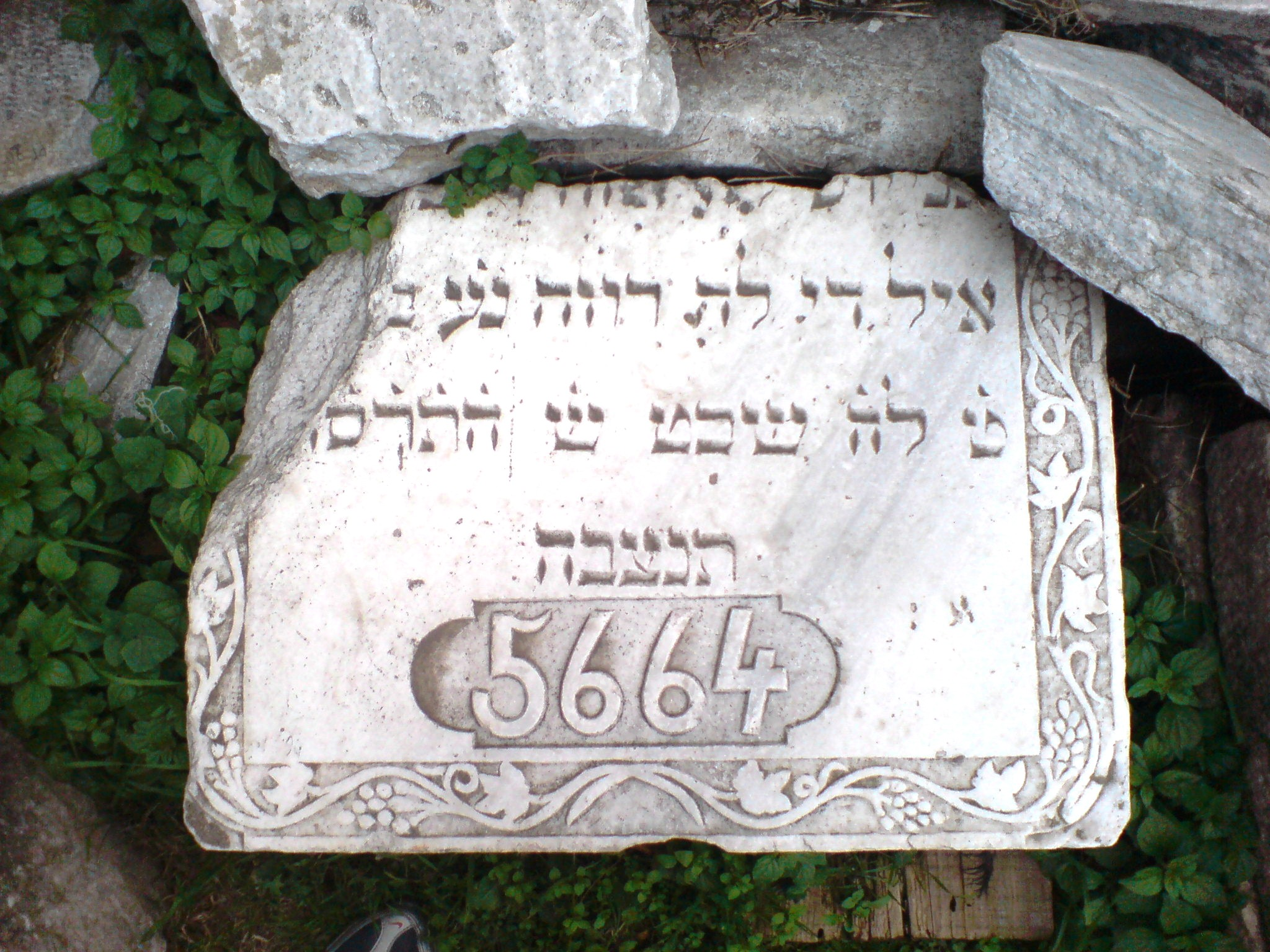
A Jewish gravestone using the Year After Creation (Anno Mundi) chronology, found just outside the Rotunda of Thessaloniki

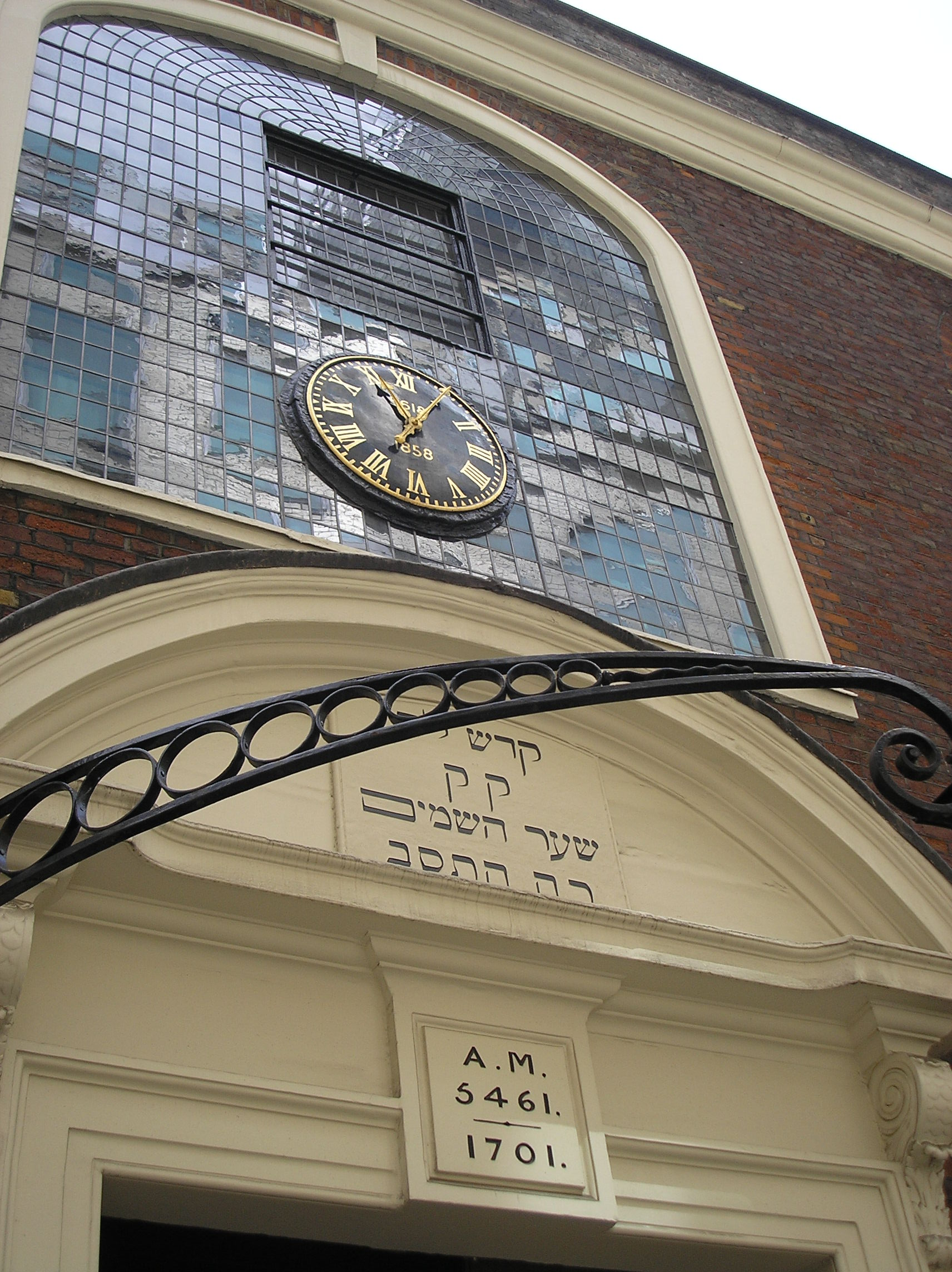
The inscription over the Bevis Marks Synagogue, City of London, gives a year in Anno Mundi (5461) and Julian calendar (1701) notations.

=== Before adoption: Seleucid and Destruction eras, 3760 BCE alternative ===
During the Talmudic era, from the 1st to the 10th centuries CE (38th–48th centuries AM), the center of the Jewish world was in the Middle East, primarily in the Talmudic academies in Babylonia and Syria Palaestina. Jews in these regions used Seleucid era dating (also known as the "Anno Graecorum (AG)" or the "Era of Contracts") as the primary method for calculating the calendar year. For example, the writings of Josephus and the Books of the Maccabees used Seleucid Era dating exclusively, and the Talmud tractate Avodah Zarah states:

Rav Aha b. Jacob then put this question: How do we know that our Era [of Documents] is connected with the Kingdom of Greece at all? Why not say that it is reckoned from the Exodus from Egypt, omitting the first thousand years and giving the years of the next thousand? In that case, the document is really post-dated! Said Rav Nachman: In the Diaspora the Greek Era alone is used. He [the questioner] thought that Rav Nahman wanted to dispose of him anyhow, but when he went and studied it thoroughly he found that it is indeed taught [in a Baraita]: In the Diaspora the Greek Era alone is used.

Occasionally in Talmudic writings, reference was made to other starting points for eras, such as Destruction Era dating, (Note: Avodah Zarah, tractate 9 Footnote: "The Eras in use among Jews in Talmudic Times are: (a) ERA OF CONTRACTS [H] dating from the year 380 before the Destruction of the Second Temple (312–1 BCE) when, at the Battle of Gaza, Seleucus Nicator, one of the followers of Alexander the Great, gained dominion over Palestine. It is also termed Seleucid or Greek Era [H]. Its designation as Alexandrian Era connecting it with Alexander the Great (Maim. Yad, Gerushin 1, 27) is an anachronism, since Alexander died in 323 BCE – eleven years before this Era began (v. E. Mahler, Handbuch der judischen Chronologie, p. 145). This Era, which is first mentioned in Mac. I, 10, and was used by notaries or scribes for dating all civil contracts, was generally in vogue in eastern countries till the 16th cent, and was employed even in the 19th cent, among the Jews of Yemen, in South Arabia (Eben Saphir, Lyck, 1866, p. 62b). (b) THE ERA OF THE DESTRUCTION (of the Second Temple) [H] the year 1 of which corresponds to 381 of the Seleucid Era, and 69–70 of the Christian Era. This Era was mainly employed by the Rabbis and was in use in Palestine for several centuries, and even in the later Middle Ages documents were dated by it. One of the recently discovered Genizah documents bears the date 13 Tammuz 987 after the Destruction of the Temple – i.e. 917 C.E. — (Op. cit. p. 152, also Marmorstein ZDMG, Vol. VI, p. 640). The difference between the two Eras as far as the tens and units are concerned is thus 20. If therefore a Tanna, say in the year 156 Era of Dest. (225 C.E.), while remembering, naturally, the century, is uncertain about the tens and units, he should ask the notary what year it is according to his – Seleucid – era. He will get the answer 536 (156 + 380), on adding 20 to which he would get 556, the last two figures giving him the year [1] 56 of the Era of Destruction.") being the number of years since the 70 CE destruction of the Second Temple, and the number of years since the Creation year based on the calculation in the Seder Olam Rabbah. By his calculation, based on the Masoretic Text, Adam and Eve were created on 1st of Tishrei (Rosh Hashanah Day 1) in 3760 BCE, later confirmed by the Muslim chronologist al-Biruni as 3,448 years before the Seleucid era. An example is the c. 8th-century CE Baraita of Samuel.

=== Adoption of 3761 BCE ===
In the 8th and 9th centuries CE the center of Jewish life moved from Babylonia to Europe, so calculations from the Seleucid era "became meaningless". From the 11th century, anno mundi dating became dominant throughout most of the world's Jewish communities, replacing the Seleucid dating system. The new system reached its definitive form in 1178 when Maimonides completed the Mishneh Torah. In the section Sanctification of the Moon (11.16), he wrote of his choice of Epoch, from which calculations of all dates should be made, as "the third day of Nisan in this present year ... which is the year 4938 of the creation of the world" (March 22, 1178). He included all the rules for the calculated calendar epoch and their scriptural basis, including the modern epochal year in his work, and establishing the final formal usage of the Anno Mundi era.

The first year of the Jewish calendar, Anno Mundi 1 (AM 1), begins slightly less than one year before creation, so that year is also called the Year of Emptiness. (Note: Based upon the Seder Olam Rabbah; a minority opinion places Creation on 25 Adar AM 1, six months earlier, or six months after the modern epoch.) The first five days of Jewish creation week occupy the last five days of AM 1, Elul 25–29. The sixth day of creation, when Adam and Eve were created, is the first day of AM 2, Rosh Hashanah (1 Tishrei). Its associated molad Adam (molad VaYaD) occurred on Day 6 (yom Vav) at 14 (Yud Daled) hours (and 0 parts). A year earlier, the first day of AM 1, Rosh Hashanah (1 Tishrei), is associated with molad tohu (new moon of chaos), so named because it occurred before creation when everything was still chaotic—it is also translated as the new moon of nothing. This is also called molad BaHaRaD, because it occurred on Day 2 (yom Beis), 5 (Hei) hours, 204 (Reish Daled) parts (11:11:20 pm). Because this is just before midnight when the Western day begins, but after 6 pm when the Jewish calendrical day begins (equivalent to the next tabular day with the same daylight period), its Julian calendar date is 6–7 October 3761 BCE (Gregorian: 6–7 September 3761 BCE or −3760).

== Greek tradition ==
The Septuagint was the most scholarly non-Hebrew version of the Old Testament available to early Christians. Many converts already spoke Greek, and it was readily adopted as the preferred vernacular-language rendering for the eastern Roman Empire. The later Latin translation called the Vulgate, an interpretative translation from Hebrew and other Greek sources, replaced it in the west after its completion by St. Jerome c. 405, Latin being the most common vernacular language in those regions.

=== Earliest Christian chronology ===
The earliest extant Christian writings on the age of the world according to the biblical chronology were therefore based on the Septuagint, due to its early availability. They can be found in the Apology to Autolycus (Apologia ad Autolycum) by Theophilus (AD 115–181), the sixth bishop of Antioch, and the Five Books of Chronology by Sextus Julius Africanus (AD 200–245).

Theophilus presents a detailed chronology "from the foundation of the world" to emperor Marcus Aurelius. His chronology begins with the biblical first man Adam through to emperor Marcus Aurelius, in whose reign Theophilus lived. The chronology puts the creation of the world at about 5529 BCE: "All the years from the creation of the world amount to a total of 5,698 years." No mention of Jesus is made in his chronology.

Ben Zion Wacholder points out that the writings of the Church Fathers on this subject are of vital significance (even though he disagrees with their chronological system based on the authenticity of the Septuagint, as compared to that of the Hebrew text) in that through the Christian chronographers a window to the earlier Hellenistic biblical chronographers (Note: Eratosthenes of Cyrene (275–194 BCE) represented contemporary Alexandrian scholarship; Eupolemus, a Palestinian Jew and a friend of Judah Maccabee, writing in 158 BCE, is said to have been the first historian who synchronized Greek history in accordance with the theory of the Mosaic origin of culture. By the time of the 1st century BCE, a world chronicle had synchronized Jewish and Greek history and had gained international circulation: Alexander Polyhistor (flourishing in 85–35 BCE); Varro (116–27 BCE); Ptolemy priest of Mendes (50 BCE), who is cited by Tatian (Oratio ad Graecos, 38); Apion (1st century AD); Thrasyllus (before AD 36); and Thallus (1st century AD) – all cited chronicles which had incorporated the dates of the Noachite flood and the exodus. Ben Zion Wacholder. "Biblical Chronology in the Hellenistic World Chronicles". in The Harvard Theological Review, Vol.61, No.3 (July 1968), pp. 451–452.) is preserved:

An immense intellectual effort was expended during the Hellenistic period by both Jews and pagans to date creation, the flood, exodus, building of the Temple ... In the course of their studies, men such as Tatian of Antioch (flourished in 180), Clement of Alexandria (died before 215), Hippolytus of Rome (died in 235), Sextus Julius Africanus of Jerusalem (died after 240), Eusebius of Caesarea in Palestine (260–340), and Pseudo-Justin frequently quoted their predecessors, the Graeco-Jewish biblical chronographers of the Hellenistic period, thereby allowing discernment of more distant scholarship.

The Chronicon of Eusebius (early 4th century) and Jerome (c. 380, Constantinople) dated creation to 5199 BCE. Earlier editions of the Roman Martyrology for Christmas Day used this date, as did the Irish Annals of the Four Masters.

=== Alexandrian era ===
The Alexandrian era was conceived and calculated in AD 412. After the initial attempts of Hippolytus, Clement of Alexandria, and others the Alexandrian computation of the date of creation was calculated to be 25 March 5493 BCE.

The Alexandrian monk Panodorus reckoned 5,904 years from Adam to AD 412. His years began on August 29, which corresponded to the First of Thoth, the first day of the Egyptian calendar. Annianus of Alexandria, however, preferred the Annunciation style for New Year's Day, i.e., March 25, and shifted Panodorus' era by circa six months to begin on March 25. This created the Alexandrian era, whose first day was the first day of the proleptic (Note: A calendar obtained by extension earlier in time than its invention or implementation; it is denominated the "proleptic" version of the calendar.) Alexandrian civil year in progress, 29 August 5493 BCE, with the ecclesiastical year beginning on 25 March 5493 BCE.

This system presents in a masterly sort of way the mystical coincidence of the three main dates of the world's history: the beginning of Creation, the Incarnation, and the Resurrection of Christ. All these events happened, according to the Alexandrian chronology, on the 25th of March; furthermore, the first two events were separated by the period of exactly 5500 years; the first and the third one occurred on Sunday – the sacred day of the beginning of the Creation and its renovation through Christ.

Dionysius of Alexandria had earlier emphatically quoted mystical justifications for the choice of March 25 as the beginning of the year:

25 March was considered to be the anniversary of Creation itself. It was the first day of the year in the medieval Julian calendar and the nominal vernal equinox (it had been the actual equinox at the time when the Julian calendar was originally designed). Considering that Christ was conceived at that date turned March 25 into the Feast of the Annunciation which had to be followed, nine months later, by the celebration of the birth of Christ, Christmas, on 25 December.

Church fathers such as Maximus the Confessor and Theophanes the Confessor, and chroniclers such as George Syncellus adopted the Alexandrian Era of 25 March 5493 BCE. Its striking mysticism made it popular in Byzantium, especially in monasteries. However, this masterpiece of Christian symbolism had two grave problems, namely historical inaccuracy regarding the date of the Resurrection as determined by its Easter computus, (Note: In the commonly used 19‐year Easter moon cycle, there was no year when the Passover (the first spring full moon, Nisan 14) would coincide with Friday and the traditional date of the Passion, March 25; according to Alexandrian system the date would have to have been Anno Mundi 5533 = 42(!)AD.) and its incompatibility with the Gospel of Saint John regarding the date of the Crucifixion on the Friday after Passover.

=== Chronicon Paschale ===
A new variant of the World Era was suggested in the Chronicon Paschale, a valuable Byzantine universal chronicle of the world, composed c. AD 630 by some representative of the Antiochian scholarly tradition. It dates the creation of Adam to 21 March 5507 BCE.

For its influence on Greek Christian chronology, and also because of its wide scope, the Chronicon Paschale takes its place beside Eusebius, and the chronicle of the monk Georgius Syncellus which was so important in the Middle Ages; but in respect of form it is inferior to these works.

=== Byzantine era ===
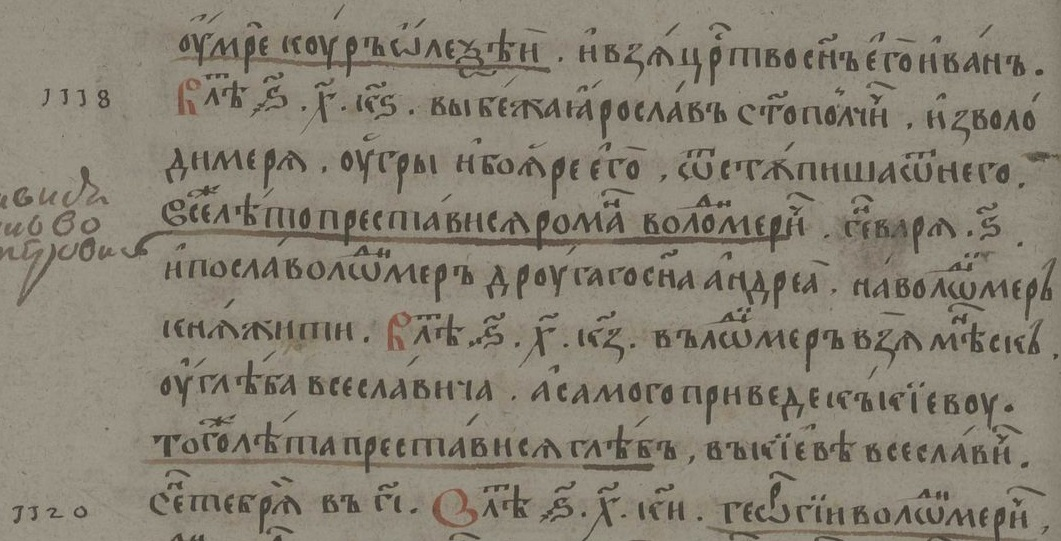
Anno Mundi notation in the Kievan Chronicle (Khlebnikov Codex). The phrase "В лѣто ҂s҃ х к҃s" reads "In the year 6626", which (as noted in the margin) corresponds to the Gregorian calendar's "1118".

The Creation Era of Constantinople or Byzantine era of the world was the official era of the Eastern Orthodox Church from c. AD 691 to 1728 in the Ecumenical Patriarchate. By the late 10th century the era, which had become fixed at 1 September 5509 BC since at least the mid-7th century (differing by 16 years from the Alexandrian date, and by 2 years from the Chronicon Paschale), had become widely accepted by Chalcedonian Christianity. The Byzantine era was used as part of the civil calendar of the Byzantine Empire from AD 988 to 1453, and by Russia from c. AD 988 to 1700. Its computation was derived from the Septuagint Biblical translation and placed the date of creation at September 1, 5,509 years before the Christian era. September 1 remains the first day of the Orthodox liturgical year. The "year of creation" was generally expressed in Greek as Etos Kosmou, literally "year of the universe."

It is now rarely used save for in Eastern Orthodox monasteries, for example, on Mount Athos in Greece and Mar Saba monastery in the West Bank. Ethiopia (where a branch of the Orthodox church is the largest religion of the country) also uses this type of timing.

=== Western Church ===
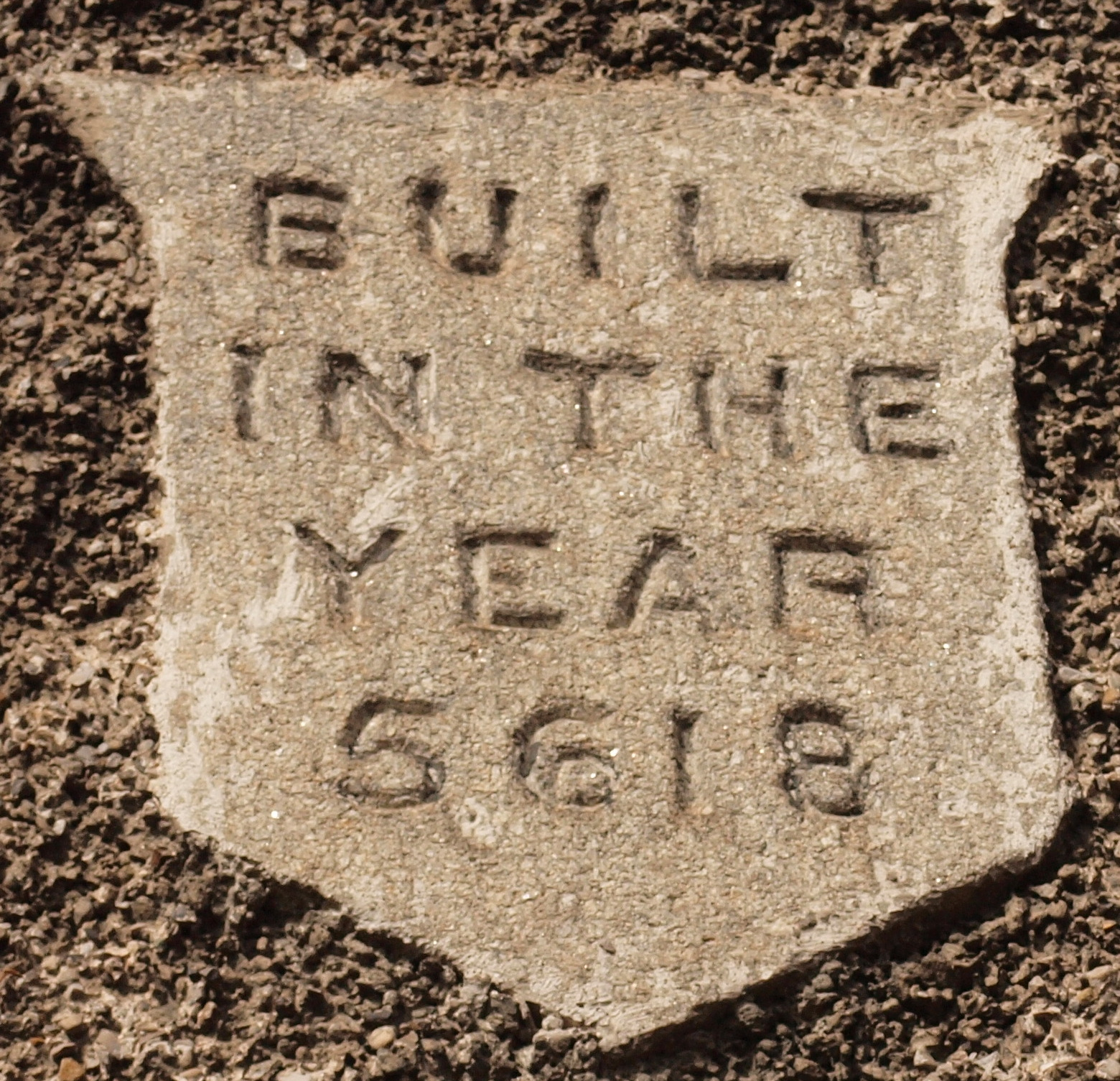
Inscription in Ballybough Cemetery, Ireland, indicating Anno Mundi 5618 (AD 1857)

Western Christianity never fully adopted an Anno Mundi epoch system, and did not at first produce chronologies based on the Vulgate that were in contrast to the Eastern calculations from the Septuagint. Since the Vulgate was not completed until only a few years before the sack of Rome by the Goths, there was little time for such developments before the political upheavals that followed in the West. Whatever the reasons, the West eventually came to rely instead on the independently developed Anno Domini (AD) epoch system. AM dating did continue to be of interest for liturgical reasons, since it was of direct relevance to the date of birth of Jesus (AM 5197–5199) and the Passion of Christ (AM 5228–5231). For example, Bede in his World-Chronicle (Chapter 66 of his De Temporum Ratione, On the Reckoning of Time), dated all events using an epoch he derived from the Vulgate which set the birth of Christ as AM 3952. In his Letter to Plegwin, Bede explained the difference between the two epochs.

== See also ==
- Anno Lucis – Dating system used in Freemasonry
- Chronology of the Bible
- Common Era – Alternative names for AD/BC, non-sectarian notation
- Dating creation – Using creation myths to date the Earth
- Epoch – Reference point from which time is measured, reference date
- Scottish Rite – Rite of Freemasonry, uses AM dating in its rituals
- Tyr, a music album by heavy metal band Black Sabbath: the opening track is called "Anno Mundi"
