= Anno Lucis =

Dating system used in Freemasonry

Examples of use

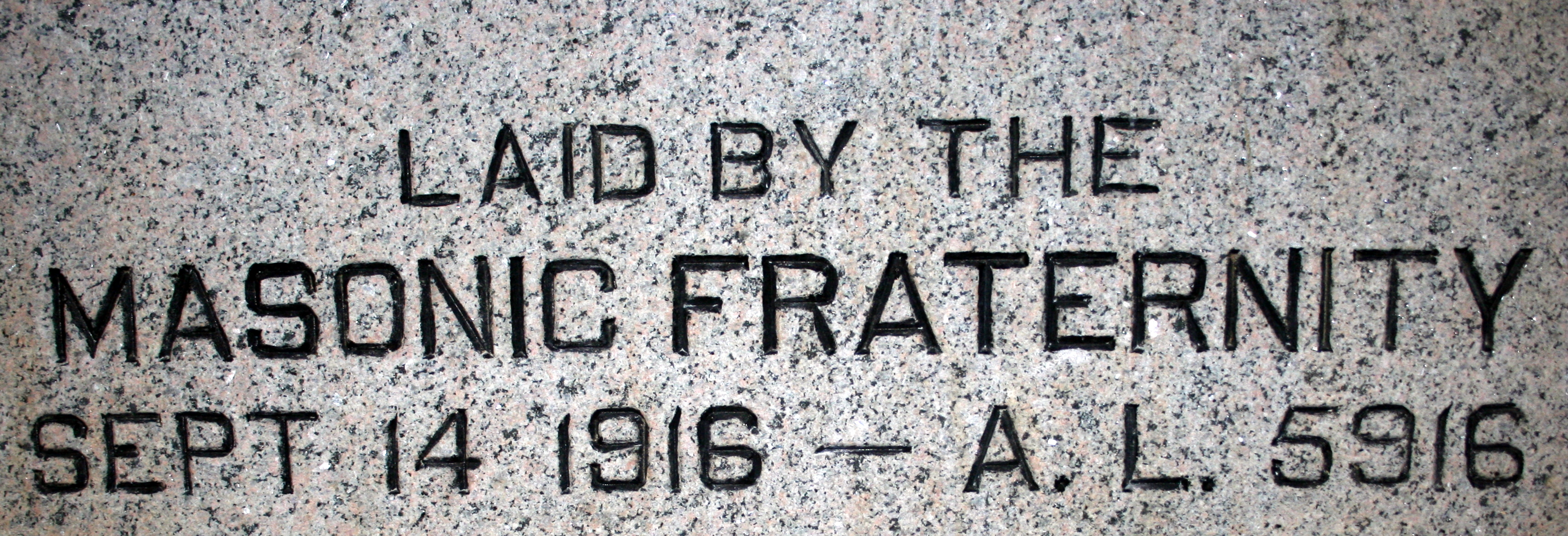
Detail from the 1916 cornerstone of a Masonic lodge in Rochester, Minnesota

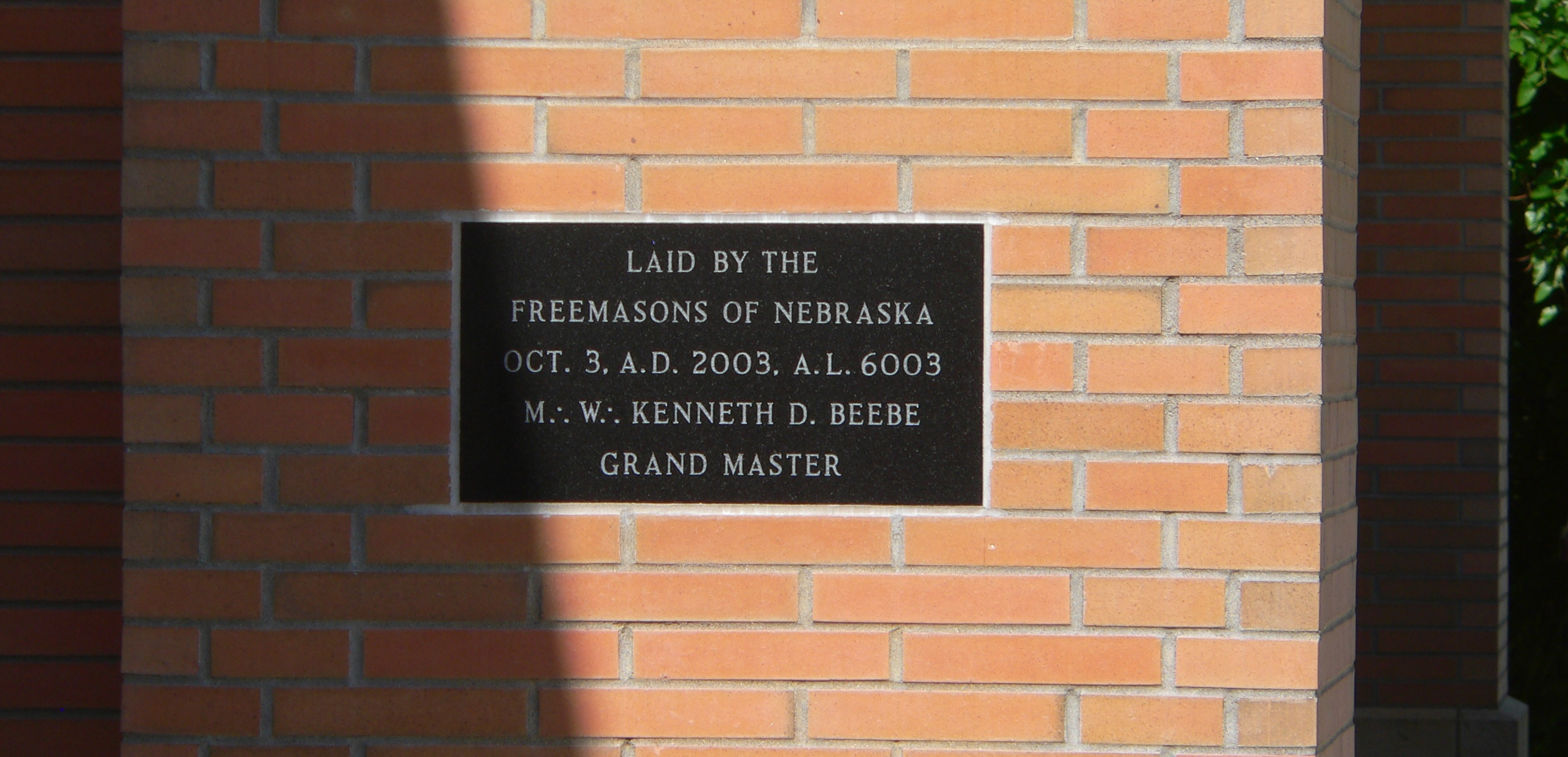
October 2003 plaque on the wall of the city hall in South Sioux City, Nebraska

Anno Lucis (“in the Year of Light”) is a dating system used in Masonic ceremonial or commemorative proceedings, which is equivalent to the Gregorian year plus 4000. It is similar to Anno Mundi.

== Description ==
For example, a date Anno Domini (AD) 2026 becomes Anno Lucis (AL) 6026. This calendar era, which would designate 4001 BC as 'year zero', was adopted in the 18th century as a simplification of the Anno Mundi era dating system used in the Hebrew calendar and borrowing from other ideas of that time regarding the year of creation.

After the Masoretic text was published, dating creation around 4000 BC became common, and it was received with wide support. Proposed calculations of the date of creation, using the Masoretic from the 10th century to the 18th century, were numerous and fluctuated by many decades. Notably, Isaac Newton's calculation pointed at the year 4000 BC.

Among the Masoretic creation estimates or calculations for the date of creation, Archbishop Ussher's specific chronology dating the creation to 4004 BC became the most accepted and popular in Protestant Christendom, mainly because this specific date was attached to the King James Bible. The Hebrew Calendar has traditionally, since the 4th century AD by Hillel II, dated the creation to 3761 BC, in accordance with the Seder Olam Rabbah compiled by Jose ben Halafta in AD 160, and in agreement with The Remaining Signs of Past Centuries, in which the Muslim chronologist al-Biruni identifies anno mundi as 3448 years before the Seleucid era, but not with Seder Olam Zutta, which dates it to 4339 BC and was compiled in AD 804.

== See also ==
- 40th century BC
- Holocene calendar – system that adds 10,000 years to the common era.
