= Annianus of Alexandria =

5th century Christian monk and writer

Annianus of Alexandria (Greek: Ἀννιανός ὁ Ἀλεξανδρεύς) was a monk and writer who flourished in Alexandria during the pontificate of Theophilus I around the beginning of the 5th century.

Annianus criticized the world history of his contemporary, the monk Panodorus of Alexandria, for relying too much on secular sources rather than biblical sources for his dates. As a result, he developed his own chronology which placed Creation on 25 March 5492 BC. This created the Alexandrian era whose first day was the first day of the proleptic Alexandrian civil year in progress, 29 August 5493 BC. This year was eleven Paschal cycles of 532 years each before the Alexandrian year beginning 29 August 360, which itself was four 19-year cycles after the epoch of the Diocletian Era on 29 August 284. The former is known as the Era of Grace in the Coptic Church, whereas the latter is known as the Era of Martyrs. He was the first computist to recognize the 532-year cycle of Easters in the Julian calendar. This cycle is often attributed to Victorius of Aquitaine in 457, the first to recognize such a cycle in the West.

None of Annianus's writings have survived. He is principally known from the discussion of his works by George Syncellus during the 9th century, though lesser fragments appear elsewhere. Elijah of Nisibis cites him in his 11th-century Chronography.

However, Annianus’ Paschal table of 532 years, containing a 532-year Paschal cycle based on a Metonic 19-year lunar cycle, has survived. Its Metonic 19-year lunar cycle was adopted by bishop Cyril of Alexandria, who used it in his own (Greek language and Alexandrian calendar) Paschal table of 114 years. Shortly before Cyril's death (AD 444), a beginning was made with a Latin language and Julian calendar Paschal table probably intended for use in the Latin part of Europe; this resulted in a similar Paschal table of 95 years, referred to as ‘the Paschal table attributed to Cyril’, which covered time interval AD 437−531. A century later this Paschal table was continued by Dionysius Exiguus to a Paschal table covering time interval AD 532−626, two centuries hereafter his Paschal table was extended to Bede’s Easter table covering time interval 532−1063 and containing a 532-year Paschal cycle. We conclude that it is precisely Annianus’ variant of the Metonic 19-year lunar cycle (invented by Anatolius) which from the sixth to the sixteenth century has been the core of the computus paschalis in the Latin Christian world, because it was not earlier than in the year 1582 that the Julian calendar was replaced with the Gregorian calendar.

As far as Victorius of Aquitaine is concerned, Jan Zuidhoek, pretending to mention explicitly all relevant Metonic 19-year lunar cycles, has missed an opportunity to mention Victorius’ one. However, Alden Mosshammer has mentioned it explicitly. In principle, each date of the 532-year Paschal cycle of Victorius’ Paschal table can be calculated by applying the old Roman rule “Paschal Sunday is the first Sunday after the first day after the Paschal full moon” to the corresponding date of the Paschal full moon of its lunar cycle (if desired with the help of the number indicating the weekday of 1 January).

== Bibliography ==
- William Adler. Time immemorial: archaic history and its sources in Christian chronography from Julius Africanus to George Syncellus. Washington, D.C.: Dumbarton Oaks Research Library and Collection, 1989 (ISBN 0884021769).
- William Adler, Paul Tuffin, translators. The chronography of George Synkellos: a Byzantine chronicle of universal history from the creation. Oxford: Oxford University Press, 2002, (ISBN 978-0199241903). Synkellos copied large blocks of text written by Annianus.
- Georges Declercq (2000) Anno Domini (The Origins of the Christian Era): Turnhout (ISBN 9782503510507)
- Mosshammer, Alden A. (2008). The Easter computus and the origins of the Christian era. Oxford: Oxford University Press. ISBN 9780199543120.
- Otto Neugebauer (1979) Ethiopic Astronomy and Computus: Wien (ISBN 9783700102892)
- Jan Zuidhoek (2019) Reconstructing Metonic 19-year Lunar Cycles (on the basis of NASA’s Six Millennium Catalog of Phases of the Moon): Zwolle (ISBN 9789090324678)
