= Dating creation =

Using creation myths to date the Earth

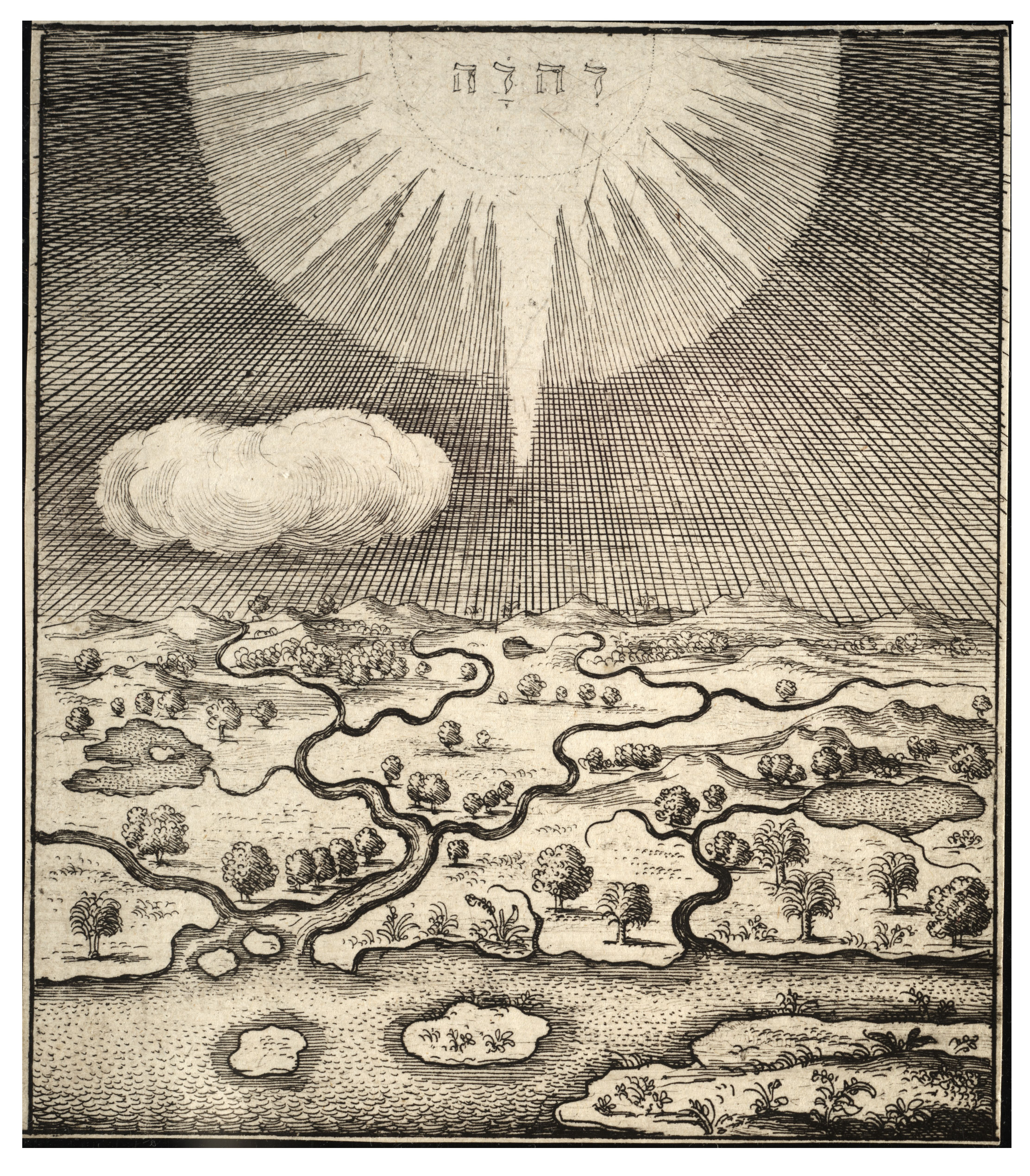
Creation of the Earth. Wenceslaus Hollar (1607–1677)

Dating creation is the attempt to provide an estimate of the age of Earth or the age of the universe as understood through the creation myths of various religious traditions. Various traditional beliefs hold that the Earth, or the entire universe, was brought into being in a grand creation event by one or more deities. After these cultures develop calendars, a question arises: Precisely how long ago did this creation event happen?

== Sumerian and Babylonian ==
One of the Old Babylonian versions of the ancient Sumerian King List (WB 444) lists various mythical antediluvian kings and gives them reigns of several tens of thousands of years. The first Sumerian king Alulim, at Eridu, is described as reigning for 28,800 years, followed by several later kings of similar periods. In total these antediluvian kings ruled for 241,200 years from the time when "the kingship was lowered from heaven" to the time when "the flood" swept over the land. However, most modern scholars do not believe the ancient Sumerians or Babylonians believed in a chronology of their own this old. Instead they believed that these figures were either fabrications, or were based on not literal solar years (365.2425 days) but instead lunar months (29.53059 days).

Cicero, reacting to the chronologies of such authors as Berossos (who composed a Greek-language history of Babylonia, known as the Babyloniaca, during the 3rd century BC), strongly criticised the claim that the Babylonians had kings going back hundreds of thousands of years:

...Let us scorn the Babylonians...the men whose records, as they themselves assert, cover a period of four hundred and seventy thousand years.

Diodorus Siculus also wrote something similar about how he believed the Babylonians fabricated their chronology:

...A man can scarcely believe them (Babylonians) for they reckon that, down to Alexander's crossing over into Asia, it has been four hundred and seventy-three thousand years, since they began in early times to make their observations of the stars.

Despite these criticisms, some ancient Greeks, including most notably Alexander Polyhistor and Proclus, believed the Babylonian kings were hundreds of thousands of years old, and that the Babylonians dated their creation 400,000–200,000 years before their own time.

== Egyptian ==
The ancient Turin King List lists a mythical predynastic "reign of the gods" which first occurred 36,620 years before Menes (3050 BC), therefore dating the creation to around 39,670 BC.

Fragments from Manetho (Eusebius, George Syncellus and preserved in Felix Jacoby's FGrH), however, list different dates. Eusebius, regarding Aegyptiaca, in his Chronicle recorded that:

...These were the first to hold sway in Egypt. Thereafter, the kingship passed from one to another in unbroken succession ... through 13,900 years — ... After the Gods, Demigods reigned for 1,255 years; and again another line of kings held sway for 1,817 years; then came thirty more kings, reigning for 1,790 years; and then again ten kings ruling for 350 years. There followed the rule of the Spirits of the Dead ... for 5,813 years ...

Using these times, 13,900 + 1,255 + 1,817 + 1,790 + 350 + 5,813 = 24,950 years, which counting back from Menes (3050 BC) fixes the creation at 28,000 BC. George Syncellus preserved yet another set of figures for the predynastic "reign of the gods", 11,984 years for Gods and 2,646 for demigods producing 14,630 years, thus dating the creation to 17,680 BC.

The Book of Sothis, considered as Pseudo-Manetho by many scholars, provides different figures. One fragment from Pseudo-Manetho dates the reign of the first Egyptian God (Ptah) 36,525 years before Menes (FGrH, #610 F2) and so dates the creation to about 39,575 BC.

The ancient Greeks reported similar figures on ancient Egyptian chronology. Diogenes Laërtius recorded that the ancient Egyptians dated their creation to their first god Hephaestus, who by interpretatio graeca was Ptah. According to Laertius, Hephaestus (Ptah) lived 48,863 years before Alexander the Great (b. 356 BC), dating the creation to 49,219 BC. Herodotus wrote that the ancient Egyptians had gods who ruled over them before the first dynasty of Egypt, but did not attempt to precisely date their creation by using their chronology:

...Thus far went the record given by the Egyptians and their priests; and they showed me that the time from the first king to that priest of Hephaestus, who was the last, covered three hundred and forty-one generations, and that in this time this also had been the number of their kings, and of their high priests. Now three hundred generations are ten thousand years, three generations being equal to a hundred. And over and above the three hundred, the remaining forty-one cover thirteen hundred and forty years. Thus the whole period is eleven thousand three hundred and forty years; in all of which time (they said) they had had no king who was a god in human form, nor had there been any such either before or after those years among the rest of the kings of Egypt...Among the Greeks, Heracles, Dionysus, and Pan are held to be the youngest of the gods. But in Egypt, Pan is the most ancient of these and is one of the eight gods who are said to be the earliest of all; Heracles belongs to the second dynasty (that of the so-called twelve gods); and Dionysus to the third, which came after the twelve. How many years there were between Heracles and the reign of Amasis, I have already shown; Pan is said to be earlier still; the years between Dionysus and Amasis are the fewest, and they are reckoned by the Egyptians at fifteen thousand. The Egyptians claim to be sure of all this, since they have reckoned the years and chronicled them in writing.

According to Herodotus the ancient Egyptian demigods began 11,340 years before the reign of Seti I (1290 BC), so 11,340 + 1290 = 12,630 BC, while he listed earlier figures, 15,000 and 17,000, for the reign of the gods.

The ancient Greek writer Diodorus Siculus wrote that the ancient Egyptians dated their creation (or start of their reign of Gods) "a little less than eighteen thousand years" from Ptolemy XII Auletes (117–51 BC).

Apollonius, an Egyptian pagan priest in the 2nd century AD, calculated the cosmos to be 153,075 years old as reported by Theophilus of Antioch.

Martianus Capella, a pagan writer, wrote in his De nuptiis in the 5th century AD that the ancient Egyptians had archives of astronomy which started 40,000 years before his own era.

Herodotus' figures were discussed by Isaac Newton in his The Chronology of Ancient Kingdoms Amended (1728) but were dismissed by Newton because they did not fit Christian cosmology.

The mathematician and esotericist R. A. Schwaller de Lubicz, in his work Sacred Science, reconstructed Herodotus' dates to conclude that the ancient Egyptians dated their creation to an astronomical (stellar) event some 30,000 years before Herodotus' own time.

== Hinduism ==
The Rig Veda questions the origin of the cosmos in the Nasadiya Sukta (the 129th hymn of Rigveda 10th mandala):

Neither being (sat) nor non-being was as yet. What was concealed? And where? And in whose protection?…Who really knows? Who can declare it? Whence was it born, and whence came this creation? The devas were born later than this world's creation, so who knows from where it came into existence? None can know from where creation has arisen, and whether he has or has not produced it. He who surveys it in the highest heavens, he alone knows-or perhaps does not know." (Rig Veda 10. 129)

Dick Teresi in his book Lost Discoveries: The Ancient Roots of Modern Science, reviewing Vedas writes that:

Twenty-four centuries before Isaac Newton, the Hindu Rig-Veda asserted that gravitation held the universe together. The Sanskrit speaking Aryans subscribed to the idea of a spherical earth in an era when the Greeks believed in a flat one. The Indians before the fifth century BCE calculated the age of the earth as 4.3 billion years; scientists in 19th century England were convinced it was 100 million years.

Carl Sagan and Fritjof Capra have pointed out similarities between the latest scientific understanding of the age of the universe and the Hindu concept of a "day and night of Brahma", which is much closer to the current known age of the universe than other creation views. The days and nights of Brahma posit a view of the universe that is divinely created, and is not strictly evolutionary, but an ongoing cycle of birth, death, and rebirth of the universe. According to Sagan:

The Hindu religion is the only one of the world's great faiths dedicated to the idea that the Cosmos itself undergoes an immense, indeed an infinite, number of deaths and rebirths. It is the only religion in which time scales correspond to those of modern scientific cosmology. Its cycles run from our ordinary day and night to a day and night of Brahma, 8.64 billion years long, longer than the age of the Earth or the Sun and about half the time since the Big Bang.

Also, as per Hinduism, Kaliyuga, the last part of the current cycle (yuga cycle) of time traditionally starts in 3102 BC.

== Greek and Roman ==
Most ancient Greek and Roman chroniclers, poets, grammarians, and scholars (Eratosthenes, Varro, Apollodorus of Athens, Ovid, Censorinus, Catullus, and Castor of Rhodes) believed in a threefold division of history: ádelon (obscure), mythikón (mythical) and historikón (historical) periods. According to the Roman grammarian Censorinus, the first period of ádelon (obscure), was calculated by Varro as follows:

The first [period] stretches from the beginning of mankind [the creation] to the first cataclysm [i.e. the flood of Ogyges].

The primordial ádelon (obscure) period ended with the flood of Ogyges and what followed was the beginning of the mythikón (mythical) period. Varro dated this flood to 2137 BC but Censorinus wrote in his De Die Natali ch. xxi that the Ogyges’ diluvium occurred 1600 years before the first Olympiad (776 BC) meaning 2376 BC. Castor of Rhodes also provided another date for the start of the mythikón (mythical) period, 2123 BC. Censorinus recorded that the second period, the mythikón, stretched from the flood of Ogyges to the first Olympiad:

The second stretches from the first cataclysm to the first Olympiad; because many myths are recorded in it, it is called “mythical”.

Censorinus quoted Varro in saying the second period (mythikón) lasted from 2137 to 776 BC, or if Censorinus' own dates are used: 2376 BC to 776 BC, or finally if Castor's: 2123 BC to 776 BC. Ovid, however, dated the start of the mythikón period to the reign of Inachus, whom he dated 400 or so years after the flood of Ogyges, meaning around 1900–1700 BC, but agreed with Varro that the mythikón ended during the first Olympiad (776 BC). See Ages of Man for more details about Ovid's chronology. Another ancient date for the start of the mythikón (mythical) period is found preserved in Augustine's City of God xviii.3, which dates it to 2050 BC. The final period according to Censorinus and Varro, the historikón (historical) era, began from 776 BC (the first Olympiad) to their own time:

The third stretches from the first Olympiad to us. Because the events in it are contained in true histories, he calls it “historical.”

Eratosthenes and Apollodorus of Athens, however, pushed back the start of the historical period to the Trojan War, which they fixed at 1184 BC.

Very few ancient Greeks or Romans attempted to date the creation, or beginning of the ádelon (obscure) period. While all ancient sources (excluding Ovid) dated the end of this period and start of the mythical (mythikón) period to 2376–2050 BC, most did not claim to know when the creation (ádelon period) exactly began. As Censorinus admitted:

If the origin of the world had been known to man, I would have begun there.

Varro and Castor of Rhodes also wrote something very similar; however, some ancient Greeks and Romans attempted to calculate the date for the creation by using ancient sources or records of mythological figures. Since Inachus was dated 400 years after the flood of Ogyges and that Ogyges himself was considered a Titan or a primordial Autochthon "from earliest ages", some ancient Greeks or Romans dated the creation (beginning with Chaos or Gaia) only a few hundred years before Ogyges (2376–2050 BC). Most ancient Greeks, however, did not subscribe to such a literalist view of using mythology to attempt to date the creation; Hecataeus of Miletus was an early ancient Greek logographer who strongly criticised this method, while Ptolemy wrote of such an "immense period" of time before the historical period (776 BC), and thus believed in a much greater age for the creation.

Among the ancient Greek and Roman philosophers there were different opinions and traditions pertaining to the date of the creation. Some philosophers believed the Universe was eternal and actually had no date of creation.

== Zoroastrianism ==
Zoroastrianism involves a 12,000-year cosmogony and chronology, often divided into four ages as outlined in the Bundahishn. The first age lasted for 3,000 years and included the spiritual creation by Ahura Mazda, followed by the physical creation of 3,000 years when evil entered the world (see Angra Mainyu). During the 6,000th year, Zoroaster's Fravashi was created, followed by the prophet Zoroaster himself at the end of the 9th millennium. The 9,000th year marked the start of the fourth and last age. Modern Zoroastrians believe they are living currently in the final age. Since evil first entered the physical creation after the spiritual creation was complete, Zoroastrians maintain that for 9,000 years the world continues to be a battlefield between Ahura Mazda and Angra Mainyu, which will end during the 12,000th year, when the Saoshyants brings about the final renovation of the world to defeat evil.

Dating precisely the beginning of the start of the 12,000th year cosmogony rests solely on the date Zoroaster is estimated to have been born. Since Zoroaster was born himself at the end of the 9th millennium (just before the 9,000th year), the date of creation can be calculated by counting back 8,900–9,000 years. The Persian Zoroastrian tradition places Zoroaster around the 7th or 6th century BC, since the Bundahishn (34. 1-9) and the Book of Arda Viraf dates Zoroaster 258 years before the era of Alexander the Great (356-323 BC) which dates Zoroaster from 614-581 BC. The 11th century Persian Muslim scholar Abū Rayḥān al-Bīrūnī also dated Zoroaster 258 years before the era of Alexander (The Remaining Signs of Past Centuries, p. 17, l. 10, transl. Sachau). This date is also found in the historical account The Meadows of Gold (iv.107) written by the 9th-century Arab historian Al-Masudi. Other Arabic, Persian and Muslim sources place Zoroaster around the same date (600 BC). Therefore, if 8,900-9,000 years are added to about 600 BC the date of creation comes to 9600-9500 BC. A 12,000 year chronology places the end date at around 2400-2500 AD, which is why modern Zoroastrians believe they are living in the last few centuries of the final era. Other dates for Zoroaster, however, differ and dates proposed for Zoroaster's birth range from 1750 to 500 BC.

== Chinese ==
The ancient Chinese historian Xu Zheng (fl. 220-265 AD) in his Three Five Historic Records dated the creation of the world by Pangu 36,000 years (2 x 18,000) before the reign of the legendary Three Sovereigns and Five Emperors. The date of the Three sovereigns is fixed at 3000–2700 BC and therefore dates the creation about 39,000 BC.

== Maya ==
The Mesoamerican Long Count calendar dates the creation of the world of human beings to 11 August 3114 BC (in the most commonly accepted correlation) according to the proleptic Gregorian calendar, or Monday, 6 September 3114 BC according to the proleptic Julian calendar. There was also a previous creation that did not have a beginning date, but a date on Stela F from Quiriguá refers to a date possibly 24 trillion years in the past.

== Jewish and Christian ==
=== Genesis creation narrative ===
Within the biblical framework and chronology, various dates have been proposed for the date of creation since ancient times, to more recent periods. The Bible begins with the Book of Genesis, in which God creates the Earth, the rest of the Universe, and the Earth's plants and animals, including the first humans, in six stages or phases (six "yom" in the original Hebrew texts, translated as "days" (Note: A day is the period of time it takes for the Earth to complete one revolution on its axis (approximately 24 hours). However, in the first creation story the Earth is not created until the third stage of the process. The Earth therefore did not exist for the first two stages, so the concept of a day did not exist for the first two stages.) in English). A second narrative begins with the first human pair, Adam and Eve, and goes on to list many of their descendants, in many cases giving the ages at which they had children and died. If these events and ages are interpreted literally throughout and the genealogies are considered closed, it is possible to build up a chronology in which many of the events of the Old Testament are dated to an estimated number of years after creation. Some biblical scholars have gone further, attempting to harmonise this biblical chronology with that of recorded history, thus establishing a date for creation in a modern calendar. Since the biblical story lacks chronology for some periods, the duration of events has been subject to interpretation in many different ways, resulting in a variety of estimates of the date of creation.

Numerous efforts have been made to determine the biblical date of creation, yielding varying results. Besides differences in interpretation, the use of different versions of the Bible can also affect the result. Two dominant dates for creation using such models exist, about 5500 BC and about 4000 BC. These were calculated from the genealogies in two versions of the Bible, with most of the difference arising from two versions of Genesis. The older dates stem from the Greek Septuagint. The later dates are based on the Hebrew Masoretic Text. The patriarchs from Adam to Terah, the father of Abraham, were often 100 years older when they begat their named son in the Septuagint than they were in the Hebrew or the Vulgate (Genesis 5, 11). The net difference between the two genealogies of Genesis amounts to 1466 years (ignoring the "second year after the flood" ambiguity), which accounts for virtually all of the 1500-year difference between 5500 BC and 4000 BC. For example, the period from the creation to the Flood derives from the genealogical table of the ten patriarchs listed in Genesis 5, and 7:6, called the generations of Adam. According to the Masoretic Text, this period consists of 1,656 years, and Western Christian Bibles deriving from the Latin Vulgate also follow this dating. However, the Samaritan texts give an equivalent period of 1,307 years, and according to the Septuagint (Codex Alexandrinus, Elizabeth Bible) it is 2,262 years. James Ussher agrees with the dating until the birth of Abraham, which he argues took place when Terah was 130, and not 70 as is the direct reading of Genesis 11:26, thus adding 60 years to his chronology for events postdating Abraham.

=== Early Jewish estimations ===
Josephus placed the creation of the world circa 5720 BC, while the earliest post-exilic Jewish chronicle preserved in the Hebrew language, the Seder Olam Rabbah, compiled by Jose ben Halafta in 160 AD, dates the creation of the world to 3761 BC while the later Seder Olam Zutta to 4339 BC. The Hebrew calendar has traditionally, since the 4th century AD by Hillel II, dated the creation to 3761 BC.

=== Septuagint ===
Many of the earliest Christians who used the Septuagint version of the Bible calculated creation as having occurred about 5500 BC, and Christians up to the Middle Ages continued to use this rough estimate: Clement of Alexandria (5592 BC), Theophilus of Antioch (5529 BC), Sextus Julius Africanus (5501 BC), Hippolytus of Rome (5500 BC), Panodorus of Alexandria (5493 BC), Maximus the Confessor (5493 BC), George Syncellus (5492 BC), Sulpicius Severus (5469 BC), Isidore of Seville (5336 BC) and Gregory of Tours (5200 BC). The Byzantine calendar has traditionally dated the creation of the world to September 1, 5509 BC.

The Chronicon of Eusebius (early 4th century) dated creation to 5199 BC. In the Roman Martyrology, the Proclamation of the Birth of Christ formerly used this date, as did the Irish Annals of the Four Masters.

Bede was one of the first to break away from the standard Septuagint date for the creation and in his work De Temporibus ("On Time") (completed in 703 AD) dated the creation to 18 March 3952 BC but was accused of heresy at the table of Bishop Wilfrid, because his chronology was contrary to accepted calculations of around 5500 BC.

=== Masoretic ===
After the Masoretic Text was published, however, dating creation around 4000 BC became common and was received with wide support among Christian scholars. Proposed calculations of the date of creation using the Masoretic from the 10th century to the 18th century include: Marianus Scotus (4192 BC), Henry Fynes Clinton (4138 BC), Henri Spondanus (4051 BC), Benedict Pereira (4021 BC), Louis Cappel (4005 BC), James Ussher (4004 BC), Augustin Calmet (4002 BC), Isaac Newton (3998 BC), Petavius (3984 BC), Theodore Bibliander (3980 BC), Johannes Kepler (April 27, 3977 BC) [Mysterium Cosmographicum chapter xxiii], Heinrich Bünting (3967 BC), Christen Sørensen Longomontanus (3966 BC), Melanchthon (3964 BC), Martin Luther (3961 BC), Cornelius Cornelii a Lapide (3961 BC), John Lightfoot (3960 BC), Joseph Justus Scaliger (3949 BC), Christoph Helvig (3947 BC), Gerardus Mercator (3928 BC), Matthieu Brouard (3927 BC), Benito Arias Montano (3849 BC), Andreas Helwig (3836 BC).

Among the Masoretic creation estimates or calculations for the date of creation only the Archbishop Ussher chronology dates the creation to 4004 BC and became the most accepted and popular, mainly because this specific date was attached to the King James Bible.

Polish Christmas carol Wśród nocnej ciszy contains text Cztery tysiące lat wyglądany (Looked out for four thousand years) related to Jesus, which also corresponds to date of creation based on Masoretic Text.

=== Alfonsine tables ===
Alfonso X of Castile commissioned the Alfonsine tables, composed of astronomical data based on observation, from which the date of the creation has been calculated to be either 6984 BC or 6484 BC.

=== Other biblical estimations ===
In 1738, Alphonse Des Vignoles said he had collected over 200 different estimates, ranging from 3483 BC to 6984 BC. John Clark Ridpath attributes these values respectively to Yom-Tov Lipmann-Muhlhausen and Regiomontanus.

- Christian Charles Josias Bunsen in the 19th century dated the creation to 20,000 BC.
- Tarleton Perry Crawford dated the creation to 12,500 BC.
- Harold Camping dated the creation to 11,013 BC.

== See also ==
- Chronology of the Bible
- Omphalos hypothesis
- Old Earth creationism
- Relationship between religion and science
- Sefer HaTemunah
- Time dilation creationism
- Young Earth creationism
