= Book of Sothis =

The Book of Sothis is a document known mainly by transmission by George Syncellus (died after 810 CE), purporting to have been written by the historian Manetho (who lived during the early 3rd century BCE). Modern scholars are nearly unanimous that the book was in fact written by someone other than Manetho, considering it a forgery written before the fifth century CE. Its contents are consequently regarded as being of little value to Egyptology, although a classic of pseudepigraphy.

The unknown author seems to have possessed a thorough knowledge of Manetho, though the best indication of forgery is the introductory dedication to Ptolemy II Philadelphus, referring to him as "σεβαστῷ" (sebastōi) — i.e. "august" or Augustus, a Roman title that was not used until centuries after Manetho's death.

However, since the original text has not been found, all claims of pseudepigraphy rely on the assumption that Syncellus' transcription of the text was equal to the original text, ruling out that he might have gotten an adapted version or that he might have paraphrased himself. Indeed, the main argument against it seems to be its controversial content, with the purported inconsistencies being merely auxiliary to the argument.

Syncellus states that Manethon included information from monuments in "the Siriadic land" (variously conjectured to be Assyria, Arabia or Egypt), that had been engraved before the Deluge, but afterward had been translated and stored in hieroglyphic books in Egyptian temples.
