= Sextus Julius Africanus =

Greco-Roman Christian traveller and historian

- Born: c. 160 possibly Jerusalem
- Died: c. 240 (aged c. 80)
- Occupations: Historian, Christian traveler

Sextus Julius Africanus (c. 160 – c. 240; Ancient Greek: Σέξτος Ἰούλιος ὁ Ἀφρικανός or ὁ Λίβυς) was a Christian traveler and historian of the late 2nd and early 3rd centuries. He influenced fellow historian Eusebius, later writers of Church history among the Church Fathers, and the Greek school of chroniclers.

== Descriptions ==
The Suda claims Africanus was a "Libyan philosopher," and Gelzer considers him of Roman and Ethiopian descent. Julius called himself a native of Jerusalem – which some scholars consider his birthplace – and lived at the neighbouring Emmaus. His chronicle indicates his familiarity with the topography of historic Judea.

Little of Africanus's life is known, and all dates are uncertain. One tradition places him under the Emperor Gordianus III (238–244), others mention him under Severus Alexander (222–235). He appears to have known Abgar VIII (176–213).

Africanus may have served under Septimius Severus against the Osroenians in 195. He went on an embassy to the emperor Severus Alexander to ask for the restoration of Emmaus, which had fallen into ruins. His mission succeeded, and Emmaus was henceforward known as Nicopolis.

Africanus traveled to Greece and Rome and went to Alexandria to study, attracted by the fame of its catechetical school, possibly about the year 215. He knew Greek (in which language he wrote), Latin, and Hebrew. He was at one time a soldier and had been a pagan; he wrote all his works as a Christian.

Whether Africanus was a layman or a cleric remains controversial. Louis-Sébastien Le Nain de Tillemont argued from Africanus's addressing the priest Origen as "dear brother" that Julius must have been a priest himself but Gelzer points out that such an argument is inconclusive.

== Writings ==
Africanus wrote Chronographiai, a history of the world in five volumes. The work covers the period from Creation to the year 221 AD. He calculated the period between Creation and Jesus as 5,500 years, placing the Incarnation on the spring equinox in AM 5501 (25 March, 1 BC). While this implies a birth in December, Africanus did not specify Jesus's birth date. This method of reckoning led to several Creation eras being used in the Greek Eastern Mediterranean, which all placed Creation within one decade of 5500 BC.

The history, which had an apologetic aim, is no longer extant, but copious extracts from it are to be found in the Chronicon of Eusebius, who used it extensively in compiling the early episcopal lists. There are also fragments in George Syncellus, Cedrenus and the Chronicon Paschale. Eusebius gives some extracts from his letter to one Aristides, reconciling the apparent discrepancy between Matthew and Luke in the genealogy of Christ by a reference to the Jewish law of Levirate marriage, which compelled a man to marry the widow of his deceased brother, if the latter died without issue. His terse and pertinent letter to Origen impugning the authority of the part of the Book of Daniel that tells the story of Susanna, and Origen's lengthy answer, are both extant.

The ascription to Africanus of an encyclopaedic work entitled Kestoi (Κέστοι "Embroidered"), treating of agriculture, natural history, military science, and other subjects, has been disputed on account of its secular and often credulous character. August Neander suggested that it had been written by Africanus before he had devoted himself to religious subjects. A fragment of the Kestoi was found in the Oxyrhynchus papyri. According to the New Schaff-Herzog Encyclopedia of Religious Knowledge, the Kestoi "appears to have been intended as a sort of encyclopedia of the material sciences with the cognate mathematical and technical branches, but to have contained a large proportion of merely curious, trifling, or miraculous matters, on which account the authorship of Julius has been questioned. Among the parts published are sections on agriculture, liturgiology, tactics, and medicine (including veterinary practise)."

== Verification of Moses ==
The Kestoi survives only in fragments, chiefly those preserved by Eusebius and Georgius Syncellus. In turn Africanus preserves fragments of the work of Polemon of Ilium' Greek History.

- FRAGMENT 13: From Georgius Syncellus, Chron., Third Book. In Euseb., Præpar., X. 40:
  - 6. And from Moses, then, to the first Olympiad there are 1020 years, as to the first year of the 55th Olympiad from the same are 1237, in which enumeration the reckoning of the Greeks coincides with us.

[...] Polemo, for instance, in the first book of his Greek History, says: In the time of Apis, king of Argos, son of Phoroneus, a division of the army of the Egyptians left Egypt, and settled in the Palestine called Syrian, not far from Arabia: these are evidently those who were with Moses.
