= Castor of Rhodes =

Greek grammarian, rhetorician, and historian

Castor of Rhodes (Greek: Κάστωρ ὁ Ῥόδιος), also known as Castor of Massalia or Castor of Galatia according to the Suda, or as Castor the Annalist, was a Greek grammarian and rhetorician. He was surnamed Philoromaeus (Φιλορώμαιος, meaning Lover of Rome) and is usually believed to have lived about the time of Cicero and Julius Caesar.

== Background ==
Castor is frequently referred to as an authority in historical matters. A partiality to the Romans is suggested by the surname Philoromaeus, and may have been evident in a work mentioned by Plutarch as comparing the institutions of Rome with those of Pythagoras.

The Suda describes the grammarian and rhetorician Castor as a son-in-law of the Galatian king Deiotarus (whom it calls a Roman senator), who afterwards put both Castor and his wife to death because Castor had brought charges against him before Caesar, evidently alluding to the affair in which Cicero defended Deiotarus. This appears to be the same Castor, mentioned by Strabo, who was surnamed Saecondarius, was a son-in-law of Deiotarus, and was put to death by him. When Cicero spoke for Deiotarus, the Castor who brought Deiotarus into peril is expressly called a grandson of that king, and was yet a young man at the time (44 BC).

It is however uncertain if this was the same Castor as the rhetorician, Castor of Rhodes. One of the works of Castor is referred to in the Bibliotheke formerly ascribed to Apollodorus of Athens, who died sometime around 140 BC. Because of this circumstance, one conclusion is that the rhetorician Castor must have lived at or before the time of Apollodorus, around 150 BC, and thus had no connection with the Deiotarus for whom Cicero spoke. Another common conclusion, which assumes Castor of Rhodes really was contemporary with Caesar and Cicero, is that Bibliotheke could not have been written by Apollodorus, hence the appellation "Pseudo-Apollodorus" for this work.

== Works ==
According to the Suda, Castor composed the following works:

- Anagraphe ton Thalassokratesanton ("Record of Thalassocrasies") in two books.
- Chronika Agnoemata ("Chronological Errors") which is also referred to by the Bibliotheca.
- Peri Epicheirematon ("On Arguments or Adventures"), in nine books.
- Peri Peithous ("On Persuasion"), in two books.
- Peri tou Neilou ("On the Nile").
- Techne Rhetorike ("Rhetorical Art")
- Chronologia or Chronika, which is referred to several times by Eusebius of Caesarea.
