= George Syncellus =

9th century Byzantine historian, philosopher and writer

George Syncellus (Greek: Γεώργιος Σύγκελλος, Georgios Synkellos; died after 810) was a Byzantine chronicler and ecclesiastical official. He lived many years in Palestine (probably in the Old Lavra of Saint Chariton or Souka, near Tekoa) as a monk, before coming to Constantinople, where he was appointed synkellos (literally, "cell-mate") to Tarasius, patriarch of Constantinople. He later retired to a monastery to write what was intended to be his great work, a chronicle of world history, Ekloge chronographias (Ἐκλογὴ Χρονογραφίας), or Extract of Chronography. According to Anastasius Bibliothecarius, George "struggled valiantly against heresy [i.e. Iconoclasm] and received many punishments from the rulers who raged against the rites of the Church", although the accuracy of the claim is suspect.

As a synkellos, George stood high in the ecclesiastical establishment of Constantinople. The position carried no defined duties, but the incumbent would generally serve as the patriarch's private secretary, and might also be used by the Emperor to limit the movements and actions of a troublesome patriarch (as was the case during the reign of Constantine VI, when several of George's colleagues were set as guards over Patriarch Tarasius). The office would be an imperial gift by the time of Basil I, and was probably so earlier; as such, George may well have owed his position to the Empress Irene. Many synkelloi would go on to become Patriarchs of Constantinople, or Bishops of other sees (for example George's colleague, John, another synkellos under Patriarch Tarasius, who became Metropolitan Bishop of Sardis in 803).

George, however, did not follow this path, instead retreating from the world to compose his great chronicle. It would appear that the Emperor Nikephoros I incurred George's disfavour at around the same time: in 808, Nikephoros discovered a plot against him, and punished the suspected conspirators, amongst whom were not only secular figures "but also holy bishops and monks and clergy of the Great Church, including the synkellos...men of high repute and worthy of respect"; it is unknown whether the synkellos in question was George himself or a colleague/successor, but the attack on the clergy, including George's friends and colleagues, would not have endeared the Emperor to George, and is suggested as the motivating factor in the "pathological hatred" towards Nikephoros I in the chronicle of Theophanes the Confessor The date of his death is uncertain; a reference in his chronicle makes clear that he was still alive in 810, and he is sometimes described as dying in 811, but there is no evidence for this, and textual evidence in the Chronicle of Theophanes suggests that he was still alive in 813.

His chronicle, as its title implies, is more of a chronological table with notes than a history. Following on from the Syriac chroniclers of his homeland, who were writing in his lifetime under Arab rule in much the same fashion, as well as the Alexandrians Annianus and Panodorus (monks who wrote near the beginning of the 5th century), George used the chronological synchronic structures of Sextus Julius Africanus and Eusebius of Caesarea, arranging his events strictly in order of time, and naming them in the year which they happened. Consequently, the narrative is regarded as secondary to the need to reference the relation of each event to other events, and as such is continually interrupted by long tables of dates, so markedly that Krumbacher described it as being "rather a great historical list [Geschichtstabelle] with added explanations, than a universal history."

George reveals himself as a staunch upholder of orthodoxy, and quotes Greek Fathers such as Gregory Nazianzen and John Chrysostom. But in spite of its religious bias and dry and uninteresting character, the fragments of ancient writers and apocryphal books preserved in it make it especially valuable. For instance, considerable portions of the original text of the Chronicle of Eusebius have been restored by the aid of George's work. His chief authorities were Annianus of Alexandria and Panodorus of Alexandria, through whom George acquired much of his knowledge of the history of Manetho; George also relied heavily on Eusebius, Dexippus and Sextus Julius Africanus.

George's chronicle was continued after his death by his friend Theophanes; Theophanes's work was heavily shaped by George's influence, and the latter may have had a greater influence on Theophanes's Chronicle than Theophanes himself. Anastasius, the Papal Librarian, composed a Historia tripartita in Latin, from the chronicles of George Syncellus, Theophanes Confessor, and Patriarch Nicephorus. This work, written between 873 and 875, spread George's preferenced dates for historical events through the West. Meanwhile, in the East George's fame was gradually overshadowed by that of Theophanes.

== Sources ==
- Editio princeps by Jacques Goar (1652) in Bonn Corpus scriptorum hist. Byz., by Karl Wilhelm Dindorf (1829).
- Heinrich Gelzer, Sextus Julius Africanus, ii. I (1885).
- H Gelzer. Sextus Julius Africanus und die byzantinische Chronographie. New York: B. Franklin, 1967, reprint of Leipzig: 1898.
- K Krumbacher, Geschichte der byzantinische Litteratur (2nd ed., Munich, 1897).
- William Adler. Time immemorial: archaic history and its sources in Christian chronography from Julius Africanus to George Syncellus. Washington, D.C.: Dumbarton Oaks Research Library and Collection, c. 1989.
- Alden A. Mosshammer, ed., Georgii Syncelli Ecloga chronographica. Leipzig: Teubner, 1984.
- William Adler, Paul Tuffin, translators. The chronography of George Synkellos: a Byzantine chronicle of universal history from the creation. Oxford: Oxford University Press, 2002.
