= Panodorus of Alexandria =

Panodorus of Alexandria was an Egyptian Byzantine monk, historian and writer who lived around 400.

He introduced a world era calculation, which reckoned 5,904 years from Adam (in Greek "ἀπό κτίσεως κόσμου", "apo ktiseos kosmou" or "ἔτος κόσμου", "etos kosmou", that is "since world's creation" or "the year of the world", in Latin "Anno Mundi") to the year 412 CE, about which time he lived. This era is usually termed the Antiochian, sometimes the Alexandrian era. Its new year was also transferred to September 1, in which case the eight latter months of its year 5493 are the eight former months of the year one of our chronology. More important than this is the Byzantine World Era, which long served as the standard of computation in the Eastern Empire, in Russia, among the Albanians, Servians, and Modern Greeks. It counts sixteen years in excess of the Antiochian era, though likewise beginning the year with September 1; its year 5509 began with September 1 of the year one before Christ. This era was in use in Russia until 1700; whence it originated appears not to be known. By the 10th century, this dating system (its beginning fixed at 5509 BCE) became standard in the Byzantine Empire and thereby, the Orthodox countries of Eastern Europe. But as such Anno Mundi time systems became very popular, they created a huge problem: end-of-world fever, caused by a threatening Seventh Day that equated to the end of the 6000-year period and corresponded to a date 500 years after Christ's birth year. So many Chiliasm, or Millenarianism, emphasizing religious movements arose at that period. In 1492, Sir Thomas Browne supported also the belief that the world was created in 5509 BCE and that its ordained lifetime was 7,000 years.

== See also ==
- Aetos Kosmou
- Anno Mundi
