= Language of the New Testament =

Language in which the New Testament was written

It is generally accepted by scholars that the New Testament was originally written in a form of Koine Greek, which was the common language of the Eastern Mediterranean from the conquests of Alexander the Great (335–323 BC) until the evolution of Byzantine Greek (c. 600).

== Hellenistic Judaism ==
The New Testament gospels and epistles were part of a broader Hellenist Jewish culture in the Roman Empire, where Alexandria had a larger Jewish population than Jerusalem, and more Jews spoke Greek than Hebrew. Other Hellenistic Jewish writings include those of Jason of Cyrene, Josephus, Philo, Demetrius the chronographer, Eupolemus, Pseudo-Eupolemus, Artapanus of Alexandria, Cleodemus Malchus, Aristeas, Pseudo-Hecataeus, Thallus, and Justus of Tiberias, Pseudo-Philo, many Old Testament Pseudepigrapha and the Septuagint translation of the Hebrew Bible itself.

== Koine Greek ==
Whereas the Classical Greek city states used different dialects of Greek, a common standard, called Koine (κοινή "common"), developed gradually in the 4th and 3rd centuries BC as a consequence of the formation of larger political structures (like the Greek colonies, Athenian Empire, and the Macedonian Empire) and a more intense cultural exchange in the Aegean area, or in other words the Hellenization of the empire of Alexander the Great.

In the Greek Dark Ages and the Archaic Period, Greek colonies were founded all over the Mediterranean basin. However, even though Greek goods were popular in the East, the cultural influence tended to work the other way around. Yet, with the conquests of Alexander the Great (333-323 BC) and the subsequent establishment of Hellenistic kingdoms (above all, the Seleucid Empire and Ptolemaic Kingdom), Koine Greek became the dominant language in politics, culture and commerce in the Near East.

During the following centuries, Rome conquered Greece and the Macedonian Kingdoms piece by piece until, with the conquest of Egypt in 30 BC, the Roman empire included all the land around the Mediterranean. However, as Horace gently puts it: "Conquered Greece has conquered the brute victor and brought her arts into rustic Latium" (Graecia capta ferum victorem cepit et artes intulit agresti Latio.) Roman art and literature were calqued upon Hellenistic models.

Koine Greek remained the dominant language in the eastern part of the Roman Empire, extending into the Byzantine Empire as Byzantine Greek. In the city of Rome, Koine Greek was in widespread use among ordinary people, and the elite spoke and wrote Greek as fluently as Latin. Jewish Koine Greek did not exist as a separate dialect, but some Jewish texts in Koine Greek do show the influence of Aramaic in syntax and the influence of Biblical background in vocabulary.

== Languages used in ancient Judea ==
After the Babylonian captivity, Aramaic replaced Biblical Hebrew as the everyday language in Judea. The two languages were as similar as two Romance languages or two Germanic languages today. Thus Biblical Hebrew, which was still used for religious purposes, was not totally unfamiliar, but still, a somewhat strange norm that demanded a certain degree of training to be understood properly.

After Alexander, Judea was ruled by the Ptolemies and the Seleucids for almost two hundred years. Jewish culture was heavily influenced by Hellenistic culture, and Koine Greek was used not only for international communication but also as the first language of many Jews. This development was furthered by the fact that the largest Jewish community in the world lived in Ptolemaic Alexandria. Many of these diaspora Jews would have Greek as their first language, and first, the Torah and then other Jewish scriptures (later the Christian "Old Testament") were therefore translated into standard Koine Greek, i.e. the Septuagint.

Currently, 1,600 Jewish epitaphs (funerary inscriptions) are extant from ancient Judea dating from 300 BC to 500 AD. Approximately 70 percent are in Greek, about 12 percent are in Latin, and only 18 percent are in Hebrew or Aramaic. "In Jerusalem itself, about 40 percent of the Jewish inscriptions from the first century period (before 70 C.E.) are in Greek. We may assume that most literate Jewish Jerusalemites who saw the inscriptions in situ were able to read them". However, this sample may be skewed as it represents written language and a large share of the population was illiterate. We know from other low-literacy societies like medieval Europe that expert literacy often correlated with knowledge of a high prestige lingua franca – Classical Latin or Koine Greek in the Roman Empire and Medieval Latin in medieval Europe.

== Languages of Jesus ==
The languages spoken in Galilee and Judea during the first century include the Semitic Aramaic and Hebrew languages as well as Greek, with Aramaic being the predominant language. Most scholars agree that during the early part of the first century Aramaic was the mother tongue of virtually all natives of Galilee and Judea. Most scholars support the theory that Jesus spoke in Aramaic and that he may have also spoken in Hebrew (Dalman suggests for the Words of Institution) and Greek. Stanley E. Porter concluded: "The linguistic environment of Roman Palestine during the first century was much more complex, and allows for the possibility that Jesus himself may well have spoken Greek on occasion."

== Language of the New Testament ==
Most biblical scholars adhere to the view that the Greek text of the New Testament is the original version.

The idea that an initial version of Matthew's Gospel was produced in Syriac has substantial historical attestation, including by Papias, Irenaeus, Eusebius, Origen and Jerome. Scholars have proposed various explanations for this assertion given that Matthew was written in Greek and is not a translation: one theory is that Matthew himself produced a Semitic work and secondly Greek recension; Josephus also claimed to write a translation of an Aramaic version of The Jewish War, though both the extant Gospel of Matthew and the War are not translations. Another is that others translated Matthew into Greek rather freely. Another is that Papias simply means "Ἑβραΐδι διαλέκτῳ" as a Hebrew style of Greek.

However, there does exist an alternative view which maintains that the New Testament is a translation from an Aramaic original, a position known as Peshitta Primacy (also known in primarily non-scholarly circles as "Aramaic primacy"). Although this view has its adherents, the vast majority of scholars dispute this position citing linguistic, historical, and textual inconsistencies. At any rate, since most of the texts are written by diaspora Jews such as Paul the Apostle and his possibly Gentile companion, Luke, and to a large extent addressed directly to Christian communities in Greek-speaking cities (often communities consisting largely of Paul's converts, which appear to have been non-Jewish in the majority), and since the style of their Greek is impeccable, a Greek original is more probable than a translation.

Even Mark, whose Greek is heavily influenced by his Semitic substratum, seems to presuppose a non-Hebrew audience. Thus, he explains Jewish customs (e.g. Mark 7:3–4, see also Mark 7), and he translates Aramaic phrases into Greek (Mark 3:17: boanerges; Mark 5:41: talitha kum; Mark 7:34: ephphatha; Mark 14:36: abba; Mark 15:22: Golgotha; Mark 15:34, see also Aramaic of Jesus and Sayings of Jesus on the cross). In the Aramaic Syriac version of the Bible, these translations are preserved, resulting in odd texts like Mark 15:34:

- Greek text
  καὶ τῇ ἐνάτῃ ὥρᾳ ἐβόησεν ὁ Ἰησοῦς φωνῇ μεγάλῃ· ελωι ελωι λεμα σαβαχθανι; ὅ ἐστιν μεθερμηνευόμενον Ὁ θεός μου ὁ θεός μου, εἰς τί ἐγκατέλιπές με;
  kaì tē̂i enátēi hṓrāi ebóēsen ho Iēsoûs phōnē̂i megálēi: elōi elōi lema sabachthani? hó estin methermēneuómenon HO theós mou ho theós mou, eis tí enkatélipés me
- Syriac text (with rough transliteration)
  ܘܒ݂ܰܬ݂ܫܰܥ ܫܳܥܺܝܢ ܩܥܳܐ ܝܶܫܽܘܥ ܒ݁ܩܳܠܳܐ ܪܳܡܳܐ ܘܶܐܡܰܪ ܐܺܝܠ ܐܺܝܠ ܠܡܳܢܳܐ ܫܒ݂ܰܩܬ݁ܳܢܝ ܕ݁ܺܐܝܬ݂ܶܝܗ ܐܰܠܳܗܝ ܐܰܠܳܗܝ ܠܡܳܢܳܐ ܫܒ݂ܰܩܬ݁ܳܢܝ܂
  wbatša‘ šā‘yin: q‘ā’ yešua‘ bqālā’ rāmā’ we’mar, ’ēl ’ēl lmānā’ šbaqtāni di’aiteyh ’elāhi ’elāhi lmānā’ šbaqtāni
- King James
  And at the ninth hour Jesus cried with a loud voice, saying, Eloi, Eloi, lama sabachthani? which is, being interpreted, My God, my God, why hast thou forsaken me?

In the Peshitta:

- Mark 7:34 does not contain the doubled-up meaning.
- Mark 15:34 has two versions of the same expression: the former in Jesus's spoken dialect, the latter in another dialect.

== Other views ==
Critics of the mainstream consensus that Greek is the original language of the New Testament claim logical improbabilities in the Greek text compared to the Syriac/Hebrew texts and vocabulary containing wordplay in the Syriac/Hebrew New Testament texts that parallels Hebraic wordplay in the Old Testament.
