= Moses in Judeo-Hellenistic literature =

The Biblical figure Moses is discussed or alluded to in surviving works by a number of Judeo-Hellenic or Judeo-Roman authors, including Eupolemus, Artapanus, Josephus, and Philo, as well as the non-Jewish Hellenistic authors discussed in the main article Moses.

Owing to the contact of the Jews with the Greeks in Alexandria, Moses was made the subject of many legends, and in many respects lifted to supernatural heights.

This is in contrast to the Torah, which represents Moses as the greatest of all prophets, to whom the Lord made Himself known face to face (Deut. xxxiv. 10; comp. Num. xii. 7), and who, when descending Mount Sinai, had a beam of light coming off his face which so filled the people with awe that they could not look at him (Ex. xxxiv. 29); but makes no attempt to lift him above the ordinary man in his nature. He lived for forty days and forty nights on the mount without eating and drinking (Deut. ix. 9), but this was owing to the power God lent him while he received the Law; he died and was buried like any other mortal (ib. xxxiv. 5–6).

== Authors ==
=== Ben Sira ===
Ben Sira was probably the first to compare him with the angels—a suggestion from Ex. xxxiv. 29 (Ecclus. xlv. 2; the Hebrew text reads "ke-elohim," while the Greek reads ἅγιοι= "saints").

=== Eupolemus ===
Especially favorable to the accretion of legends or fictions around the life of Moses was that he was born in Egypt and brought up by the daughter of the king. This suggested that "he was learned in all the wisdom of the Egyptians" (Acts vii. 22). But the Jewish men of letters who lived in Alexandria were by no means satisfied with the idea that Moses acquired the wisdom of the Egyptians; they claimed for him the merit of having given to Egypt, Phoenicia, and Hellas all their culture. He taught the Jews the letters, and they then became the teachers of the Phoenicians and, indirectly, of the Greeks, says Eupolemus.

=== Artapanus of Alexandria ===
Artapanus of Alexandria, in his history of the Jews, went so far as to identify Moses with Tot-Hermes (the Egyptian messenger and scribe of the gods, who invented the letters, the various arts of peace and of war, as well as philosophy), and with the Greek Musaeus, "the teacher of Orpheus." He even ascribed to him the division of the land into its thirty-six districts, with their various forms of worship. As the foster-mother of Moses, Artapanus names Merris, the wife of Chenephres, King of Upper Egypt; being childless, she pretended to have given birth to him and brought him up as her own child.(Eusebius, l.c. ix. 27).

"Jealousy of Moses' excellent qualities induced Chenephres to send him with unskilled troops on a military expedition to Ethiopia, where he won great victories. After having built the city of Hermopolis, he taught the people the value of the ibis as a protection against the serpents, making the bird the sacred guardian spirit of the city; then he introduced circumcision. After his return to Memphis, Moses taught the people the value of oxen for agriculture, and the consecration of the same by Moses gave rise to the cult of Apis. Finally, after having escaped another plot by killing the assailant sent by the king, Moses fled to Arabia, where he married the daughter of Raguel, the ruler of the district.

Chenephres in the meantime died from elephantiasis [comp. Ex. R. i. and Targ. Yer. to Ex. ii. 23]—a disease with which he was the first to be afflicted—because he had ordered that the Jews should wear garments that would distinguish them from the Egyptians and thereby expose them to maltreatment [this is characteristic of the age in which it was written]. The sufferings of Israel then caused God to appear to Moses in a flame bursting forth from the earth [not from the bush!], and to tell him to march against Egypt for the rescue of his people.

Accordingly he went to Egypt to deliberate with his brother Aaron about the plan of warfare, but was put into prison. At night, however, the doors of the prison opened of their own accord, while the guards died or fell asleep. Going to the royal palace and finding the doors open there and the guards sunk in sleep, he went straight to the king, and when scoffingly asked by the latter for the name of the God who sent him, he whispered the Ineffable Name into his ear, whereupon the king became speechless and as one dead. Then Moses wrote the name upon a tablet and sealed it up, and a priest who made sport of it died in convulsions. After this Moses performed all the wonders, striking land and people with plagues until the king let the Jews go. In remembrance of the rod with which Moses performed his miracles every Isis temple in Egypt has preserved a rod—Isis symbolizing the earth which Moses struck with his rod"

The record closes with a description of the personality of Moses: "He was eighty-nine years old when he delivered the Jews; tall and ruddy, with long white hair, and dignified."

=== Josephus ===
Fantastic as these stories are, they are scarcely inventions of Artapanus only. Long contact of the Jews of Alexandria with Egyptian men of letters in a time of syncretism, when all mythology was being submitted to a rationalizing process, naturally produced such fables (see Freudenthal, "Hellenistische Studien," 1875, pp. 153–174), and they have found a place in the Palestinian as well as in the Hellenistic haggadah, in Josephus, Philo ("De Vita Moysis"), and the Alexandrian dramatist Ezekiel (Eusebius, l.c. ix. 28), as well as in the Midrash (Ex. R. i.-ii.; Tan., Shemot), the Targum, and the "Sefer ha-Yashar," or the older "Chronicles of Jerahmeel" (xliv.-l.).

Most elaborate is the haggadah from which Josephus drew his story ("Ant." ii. 9, § 2-ii. 10, § 2):(comp. Sanh. 101b; Ex. R. i.; Targ. Yer. to Ex. i. 14; see Jannes and Jambres).

"Egyptian priests skilled in prophesying foretold the birth of a Hebrew who would bring misfortune on Egypt, and thus caused Pharaoh's edict to have every new-born male child drowned in the river" (see Amram; Miriam).

"Amram in his distress at the fate of every new-born child prays to God and receives a revelation" (comp. Ezekiel in Eusebius, l.c. ix. 29; "Chronicles of Jerahmeel," xliv. 8; Yal?. i. 166).

"Thermutis was the name of the princess who saw Moses in the water-cradle and conceived a love for him on account of his striking beauty. The child, however, refused to suckle from any other breast but that of his mother." "Moses excelled all by his tall stature and beauty of countenance as well as by his quickness of apprehension." "Thermutis, being without child, brought him up as her own son, and one day when she presented him to her father as her own child, and heir to the throne—a gift she had received from the river-god—Pharaoh took the child on his lap and placed his diadem upon its head; whereupon it cast it down on the ground and trampled upon it. This was taken as an evil omen by the king, and the priestly soothsayer, finding Moses to be the one who would bring upon the kingdom the misfortune predicted for it, wished to slay him, but Thermutis succeeded in saving his life" (comp. "Chronicles of Jerahmeel," xlv.-xlvi.; Yal?. i. 168).

"An attack on Egypt by the Ethiopians caused all to look to Moses for aid, and the king asked his daughter to permit him to go forth as general of an army to Ethiopia. Moses took the short road along the desert, deemed impassable on account of its many flying serpents ('serafim'), and provided himself with numerous baskets filled with ibises, the destroyers of serpents, by the help of which he removed the dangers of the desert. He thus took the Ethiopians by surprise and defeated them, driving them back to Merve, a fortified city. While he was besieging the city, Therbis, the daughter of the king, saw him upon the walls, fell in love with him, and proposed to him to become his wife. He accepted the offer under the condition that the city should surrender to him; finally he married her"

This is obviously a midrashic tale connected with Num. xii. 1, but disavowed at a later stage (see Sifre, Num. 99, and Targ. ad loc.).

=== Philo ===
Philo also shows familiarity with these legends; he refers to the beauty of the babe Moses (l.c. i. 3) and mentions the fact that the princess, being childless, contrived to make Moses appear as her own child (i. 4–5). Moses' education in science, art, and philosophy, however, is ascribed to Egyptian masters (i. 6); he was grieved by the sufferings of his Hebrew brethren, many of whom died an untimely death and did not have even seemly burial (i. 7); his prophetic powers were attested at the Red Sea when the Egyptian dead were cast up by the waves and were actually seen by the Israelites, as Moses had announced (iii. 34, with reference to Ex. xiv. 13, 30).

== Moses' death, or elevation, or pre-existence ==
The end of the great lawgiver especially was surrounded with legends.

"While, after having taken leave of the people, he was going to embrace Eleazar and Joshua on Mount Nebo, a cloud suddenly stood over him, and he disappeared, though he wrote in Scripture that he died, which was done from fear that people might say that because of his extraordinary virtue he had been turned into a divinity" (Josephus, "Ant." iv. 8, § 48).

Philo says:

"He was entombed not by mortal hands, but by immortal powers, so that he was not placed in the tomb of his forefathers, having obtained a peculiar memorial [i.e., grave] which no man ever saw" ("De Vita Moysis," iii. 39).

Later on, the belief became current that Moses did not die, but was taken up to heaven like Elijah. This seems to have been the chief content of the apocryphon entitled the Assumption of Moses, preserved only in fragmentary form.

No sooner was the view maintained that Moses was translated to heaven than the idea was suggested that his soul was different from that of other men. Like the Messiah, he is said to have been preexistent; he is thus represented in the Assumption of Moses (i. 12–14),

"He was prepared before the foundation of the world to be the mediator of God's covenant, and as he was Israel's intercessor with God during life [xi. 11, 17], so is he to be the intercessor in all the future."

While his death was an ordinary one (i. 15, x. 14), "no place received his body"; "his sepulcher is from the rising of the sun to the setting thereof, and from the south to the confines of the north; all the world is his sepulcher" (xi. 5–8).

Philo also calls Moses "the mediator and reconciler of the world" (ib. iii. 19). Especially in Essene circles was Moses apotheosized: "Next to God," says Josephus, "they honor the name of their legislator, and if any one blasphemes him he meets with capital punishment" ("B. J." ii. 8, § 9; comp. "Ant." iii. 15, § 3).

== Moses in Hellenistic literature ==
Non-biblical writings about Jews, with references to the role of Moses, first appear at the beginning of the Hellenistic period, from 323 BCE to about 146 BCE. Shmuel notes that "a characteristic of this literature is the high honour in which it holds the peoples of the East in general and some specific groups among these peoples."

In addition to the Judeo-Roman or Judeo-Hellenic historians Artapanus, Eupolemus, Josephus, and Philo, a few non-Jewish historians including Hecataeus of Abdera (quoted by Diodorus Siculus), Alexander Polyhistor, Manetho, Apion, Chaeremon of Alexandria, Tacitus and Porphyry also make reference to him. The extent to which any of these accounts rely on earlier sources is unknown. Moses also appears in other religious texts such as the Mishnah (c. 200 CE), Midrash (200–1200 CE), and the Qur'an (c. 610–53).

The figure of Osarseph in Hellenistic historiography is a renegade Egyptian priest who leads an army of lepers against the pharaoh and is finally expelled from Egypt, changing his name to Moses.

=== In Hecataeus ===
The earliest existing reference to Moses in Greek literature occurs in the Egyptian history of Hecataeus of Abdera (4th century BCE). All that remains of his description of Moses are two references made by Diodorus Siculus, wherein, writes historian Arthur Droge, "he describes Moses as a wise and courageous leader who left Egypt and colonized Judaea." Among the many accomplishments described by Hecataeus, Moses had founded cities, established a temple and religious cult, and issued laws:

After the establishment of settled life in Egypt in early times, which took place, according to the mythical account, in the period of the gods and heroes, the first... to persuade the multitudes to use written laws was Mneves, a man not only great of soul but also in his life the most public-spirited of all lawgivers whose names are recorded.

Droge also points out that this statement by Hecataeus was similar to statements made subsequently by Eupolemus.

=== In Artapanus ===
The Jewish historian Artapanus of Alexandria (2nd century BCE), portrayed Moses as a cultural hero, alien to the Pharaonic court. According to theologian John Barclay, the Moses of Artapanus "clearly bears the destiny of the Jews, and in his personal, cultural and military splendor, brings credit to the whole Jewish people."

Jealousy of Moses' excellent qualities induced Chenephres to send him with unskilled troops on a military expedition to Ethiopia, where he won great victories. After having built the city of Hermopolis, he taught the people the value of the ibis as a protection against the serpents, making the bird the sacred guardian spirit of the city; then he introduced circumcision. After his return to Memphis, Moses taught the people the value of oxen for agriculture, and the consecration of the same by Moses gave rise to the cult of Apis. Finally, after having escaped another plot by killing the assailant sent by the king, Moses fled to Arabia, where he married the daughter of Raguel [Jethro], the ruler of the district.

Artapanus goes on to relate how Moses returns to Egypt with Aaron, and is imprisoned, but miraculously escapes through the name of YHWH in order to lead the Exodus. This account further testifies that all Egyptian temples of Isis thereafter contained a rod, in remembrance of that used for Moses' miracles. He describes Moses as 80 years old, "tall and ruddy, with long white hair, and dignified."

Some historians, however, point out the "apologetic nature of much of Artapanus' work," with his addition extra-biblical details, as with references to Jethro: the non-Jewish Jethro expresses admiration for Moses' gallantry in helping his daughters, and chooses to adopt Moses as his son.

=== In Strabo ===
Strabo, a Greek historian, geographer and philosopher, in his Geography (c. 24 CE), wrote in detail about Moses, whom he considered to be an Egyptian who deplored the situation in his homeland, and thereby attracted many followers who respected the deity. He writes, for example, that Moses opposed the picturing of the deity in the form of man or animal, and was convinced that the deity was an entity which encompassed everything – land and sea:

35. An Egyptian priest named Moses, who possessed a portion of the country called the Lower Egypt, being dissatisfied with the established institutions there, left it and came to Judaea with a large body of people who worshipped the Divinity. He declared and taught that the Egyptians and Africans entertained erroneous sentiments, in representing the Divinity under the likeness of wild beasts and cattle of the field; that the Greeks also were in error in making images of their gods after the human form. For God [said he] may be this one thing which encompasses us all, land and sea, which we call heaven, or the universe, or the nature of things....

36. By such doctrine Moses persuaded a large body of right-minded persons to accompany him to the place where Jerusalem now stands....

In Strabo's writings of the history of Judaism as he understood it, he describes various stages in its development: from the first stage, including Moses and his direct heirs; to the final stage where "the Temple of Jerusalem continued to be surrounded by an aura of sanctity." Strabo's "positive and unequivocal appreciation of Moses' personality is among the most sympathetic in all ancient literature." His portrayal of Moses is said to be similar to the writing of Hecataeus who "described Moses as a man who excelled in wisdom and courage."

Egyptologist Jan Assmann concludes that Strabo was the historian "who came closest to a construction of Moses' religion as monotheism and as a pronounced counter-religion." It recognized "only one divine being whom no image can represent... [and] the only way to approach this god is to live in virtue and in justice."

=== In Tacitus ===
The Roman historian Tacitus (c. 56–120 CE) refers to Moses by noting that the Jewish religion was monotheistic and without a clear image. His primary work, wherein he describes Jewish philosophy, is his Histories (c. 100), where, according to Murphy, as a result of the Jewish worship of one God, "pagan mythology fell into contempt." Tacitus states that, despite various opinions current in his day regarding the Jews' ethnicity, most of his sources are in agreement that there was an Exodus from Egypt. By his account, the Pharaoh Bocchoris, suffering from a plague, banished the Jews in response to an oracle of the god Zeus-Amun.

A motley crowd was thus collected and abandoned in the desert. While all the other outcasts lay idly lamenting, one of them, named Moses, advised them not to look for help to gods or men, since both had deserted them, but to trust rather in themselves, and accept as divine the guidance of the first being, by whose aid they should get out of their present plight.

In this version, Moses and the Jews wander through the desert for only six days, capturing the Holy Land on the seventh.

=== In Longinus ===
The Septuagint, the Greek version of the Hebrew Bible, influenced Longinus, who may have been the author of the great book of literary criticism, On the Sublime. The date of composition is unknown, but it is commonly assigned to the late Ist century C.E.

The writer quotes Genesis in a "style which presents the nature of the deity in a manner suitable to his pure and great being," however he does not mention Moses by name, calling him 'no chance person' (οὐχ ὁ τυχὼν ἀνήρ ) but "the Lawgiver" (θεσμοθέτης) of the Jews," a term that puts him on a par with Lycurgus and Minos. Aside from a reference to Cicero, Moses is the only non-Greek writer quoted in the work, contextually he is put on a par with Homer, and he is described "with far more admiration than even Greek writers who treated Moses with respect, such as Hecataeus and Strabo.

=== In Josephus ===
In Josephus' (37 – c. 100 CE) Antiquities of the Jews, Moses is mentioned throughout. For example Book VIII Ch. IV, describes Solomon's Temple, also known as the First Temple, at the time the Ark of the Covenant was first moved into the newly built temple:

When King Solomon had finished these works, these large and beautiful buildings, and had laid up his donations in the temple, and all this in the interval of seven years, and had given a demonstration of his riches and alacrity therein; ...he also wrote to the rulers and elders of the Hebrews, and ordered all the people to gather themselves together to Jerusalem, both to see the temple which he had built, and to remove the ark of God into it; and when this invitation of the whole body of the people to come to Jerusalem was everywhere carried abroad, ...The Feast of Tabernacles happened to fall at the same time, which was kept by the Hebrews as a most holy and most eminent feast. So they carried the ark and the tabernacle which Moses had pitched, and all the vessels that were for ministration to the sacrifices of God, and removed them to the temple. ...Now the ark contained nothing else but those two tables of stone that preserved the ten commandments, which God spake to Moses in Mount Sinai, and which were engraved upon them...

According to Feldman, Josephus also attaches particular significance to Moses' possession of the "cardinal virtues of wisdom, courage, temperance, and justice." He also includes piety as an added fifth virtue. In addition, he "stresses Moses' willingness to undergo toil and his careful avoidance of bribery. Like Plato's philosopher-king, Moses excels as an educator."

=== In Numenius ===
Numenius, a Greek philosopher who was a native of Apamea, in Syria, wrote during the latter half of the 2nd century CE. Historian Kennieth Guthrie writes that "Numenius is perhaps the only recognized Greek philosopher who explicitly studied Moses, the prophets, and the life of Jesus..." He describes his background:

Numenius was a man of the world; he was not limited to Greek and Egyptian mysteries, but talked familiarly of the myths of Brahmins and Magi. It is however his knowledge and use of the Hebrew scriptures which distinguished him from other Greek philosophers. He refers to Moses simply as "the prophet", exactly as for him Homer is the poet. Plato is described as a Greek Moses.

== Sources ==
- Assmann, Jan (1997), Moses the Egyptian: The Memory of Egypt in Western Monotheism, Harvard University Press, ISBN 978-0-674-58738-0
- Droge, Arthur J (1989), Homer or Moses?: Early Christian Interpretations of the History of Culture, Mohr Siebeck
- Guthrie, Kenneth Sylvan (1917), Numenius of Apamea: The Father of Neo-Platonism, George Bell & Sons
- Shmuel, Safrai (1976), Stern, M (ed.), The Jewish People in the First Century, Van Gorcum Fortress Press

== See also ==
- Moses in rabbinic literature
