= Demetrius the Chronographer =

Jewish chronicler

Demetrius the Chronographer (or Demetrius the Chronicler; Ancient Greek: Δημήτριος) was a Jewish chronicler (historian) of the late 3rd century BCE, who lived probably in Alexandria and wrote in Greek.

== Works ==
His text is almost entirely lost and only a few fragments have survived in the following ancient texts: Eusebius's Praeparatio Evangelica, (for fragments 1–5), the Stromata of Clement of Alexandria and in quotations from the book About Jews of the historian Alexander Polyhistor (used by Eusebius).

From the orthography of proper names, and from various expressions used, it is evident that Demetrius used the Septuagint text of the Bible. For the determination of certain dates he relied on the Biblical exegesis in use among the Palestinian Jews. Josephus used Demetrius' chronicles for his Antiquities of the Jews and adopted his chronological system.

Demetrius is not an apologist in the usual meaning: his main focus is patriarchal chronology, and there is no attention given to theological matters.

== Fragments ==
There are six fragments usually considered Demetrius' work. The first short fragment (found in Praeparatio Evangelica 9.19.4) is about the sacrifice of Isaac (Gen. 22).

The second fragment is the longest. It is found in Praeparatio Evangelica 9.21.1–19 and deals with the history of Jacob from the time of his emigration to Mesopotamia till his death. Demetrius endeavors to establish the Biblical chronology and gives the date of every incident in Jacob's life, even fixing the year and month in which each of Jacob's children was born. The excerpt concludes with the genealogy of Levi down to the birth of Aaron and Moses.

The third fragment (Praeparatio Evangelica 9.29.1–3) is an extract from the history of Moses, laying stress on the genealogy of Jethro in order to demonstrate that Zipporah, the wife of Moses, was a descendant of Abraham and Keturah. The fourth fragment (Praeparatio Evangelica 9.29.15) gives an account of the sweetening of the water of Marah (Exodus 15–:22–27). Fragment five (Praeparatio Evangelica 9.29.15-end) is very short and is about Israelites's weapons referred to in chapter 14 of Exodus.

The last fragment was preserved by Clement of Alexandria (Stromata i. 21, 141), who gives the title of Demetrius' chronicles as Περὶ τῶν ἐν τῇ Ἰουδαίᾳ Βασιλέων (On the Kings of Judea). This fragment endeavors to determine exactly the period of the exile of the Ten Lost Tribes, and that of the tribes of Judah and Benjamin till Ptolemy IV Philopator, in whose reign Demetrius evidently lived.

== Date and provenance ==
Fragment 6 refers to Ptolemy IV (c. 221–204 B.C.); hence Demetrius's work is dated to his reign and placed in Egypt. Demetrius was the earliest known Jewish author writing in Greek.
