= Polyhistor (disambiguation) =

A polyhistor is a gifted person with broad knowledge.

It may also refer to:

- Polyhistor (book), a Roman book and author
- Alexander Polyhistor, an ancient Greek scholar
