= Pedantry =

Excessive concern with unimportant details

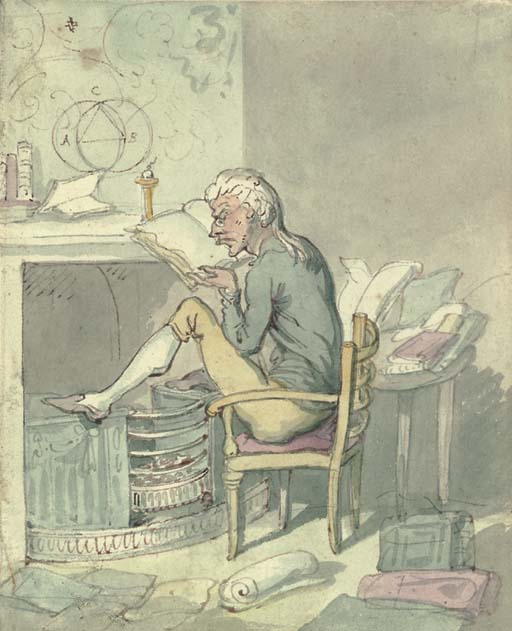
The Pedant by caricaturist Thomas Rowlandson

Pedantry (/ˈpɛd.ən.tri/ PED-ən-tree) is an excessive concern with formalism, minor details, and rules that are not important, such as concerns over grammar mistakes.

== Etymology ==
"Pedantry" is the derived form of the 1580s English noun pedant, which meant a male schoolteacher at the time. The word "pedant" originated from the French word for "schoolmaster", pédant, in the 1560s, or from the Italian word for "teacher, schoolmaster", pedante. Both of these words are likely an alteration of Late Latin word paedagogantes. The pejorative meaning of a "person who trumpets minor points of learning... or lays undue stress on exact knowledge of details" comes from the 1590s. In ancient Greece, a paedagogus was a slave entrusted with teaching young Roman boys.

== Analysis ==
Ultimately, pedantry could be viewed as an attempt to show superiority by appearing more intelligent, through tasks as simple as correcting a peer's grammar online. Fowler's Concise Dictionary of Modern English (1926) recognised that the term pedantry was "relative" and subjective, stating "my pedantry is your scholarship, his reasonable accuracy, her irreducible minimum of education, and someone else's ignorance".

== See also ==
- Perfectionism (psychology)
- Anti-intellectualism
