= Moses in rabbinic literature =

The Biblical character Moses, who led the Israelites out of Egypt and through their wanderings in the wilderness, is discussed extensively in rabbinic literature. Such literature and commentaries contain various expansions, elaborations, and inferences beyond what is presented in the Bible itself.

== Overview ==
Rav Zouché said: "When my time comes and I stand before Hashem, I am not afraid that He will ask me why I was not at the level of Moshe Rabbeinu. But I am afraid that He will ask me why I was not Zouché!"

Of all Biblical personages, Moses has been chosen most frequently as the subject of later legends, and his life has been recounted in full midrashic detail in the poetic Aggadah. As liberator, lawgiver, and leader of the Children of Israel, who he transformed from an unorganized horde into a nation, he occupies a more important place in popular legend than the Patriarchs and all the other national heroes. His many-sided activity also offered more abundant scope for imaginative embellishment. A cycle of legends has been woven around nearly every trait of his character and every event of his life, and groups of the most different and often contradictory stories have been connected with his career.

== Biography ==
=== The beginnings ===
Moses's influence and activity reach back to the days of the Creation. Heaven and earth were created only for his sake. The account of the creation of the water on the second day, therefore, does not close with the usual formula—"And God saw that it was good”—because God foresaw that Moses would suffer through the water. Although Noah was not worthy of being saved from the Flood, he was saved nevertheless because Moses was destined to descend from him. The angels that Jacob in his nocturnal vision saw ascending to and descending from heaven were really Moses and Aaron.

The birth of Moses as the liberator of the people of Israel was foretold to Pharaoh by his soothsayers, in consequence of which he issued the cruel command to cast all the male children into the river. Later on, Miriam also foretold to her father, Amram, that a son would be born to him who would liberate Israel from the yoke of Egypt.

Moses was born on Adar 7, in the year 2377 after the creation of the world. He was born circumcised, and was able to walk immediately after his birth; but according to another story he was circumcised on the eighth day after birth. A peculiar and glorious light filled the entire house at his birth, indicating that he was worthy of the gift of prophecy. He spoke with his father and mother on the day of his birth and prophesied at the age of three. His mother kept his birth secret for three months when Pharaoh was informed that she had borne a son. The mother put the child into a casket, which she hid among the reeds of the sea before the king's officers came to her. For seven days his mother went to him at night to nurse him, his sister Miriam protecting him from the birds by day.

=== Rescue by Pharaoh's daughter ===
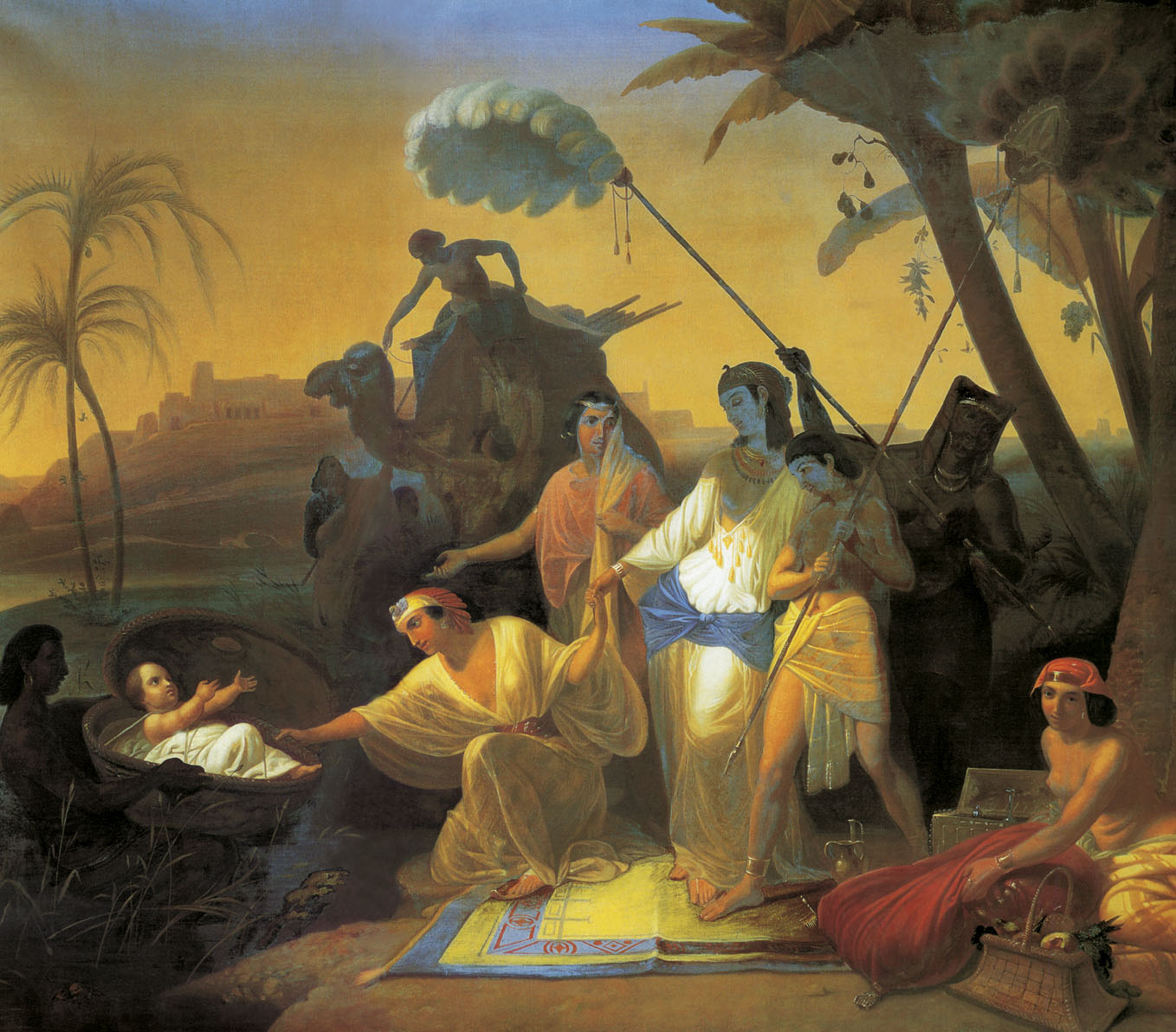
Finding of the baby Moses, by Konstantin Dmitriyevich Flavitsky

Then God sent a fierce heat upon Egypt, and Pharaoh's daughter Bithiah, who was afflicted with leprosy, went to bathe in the river. Hearing a child cry, she beheld a casket in the reeds. She caused it to be brought to her and, on touching it, was cured of her leprosy. For this reason, she was kindly disposed toward the child. When she opened the casket, she was astonished at his beauty, and saw the Shekinah with him. Noticing that the child was circumcised, she knew that the parents must have been Hebrews.

Gabriel struck Moses to make him cry and arouse the pity of the princess. She wished to save the child, but as her maids told her she must not transgress her father's commands, she set him down again. Then Gabriel threw all her maids down; and God filled Bithiah with compassion, and caused the child to find favor in her eyes. She took the child up, saved him, and loved him much. This was on the sixth day of the month of Sivan; according to another version, on Nisan 21.

When the soothsayers told Pharaoh that the redeemer of Israel had been born and thrown into the water, the cruel edict ordering that the children be thrown into the river was repealed. Thus, the casting away of Moses saved Israel from further persecution. According to another version, 600,000 children had already been thrown into the river, but all were saved because of Moses.

=== His upbringing ===
Bithiah, Pharaoh's daughter, took the child to nurse him, but he refused the breast. Then she gave him to other Egyptian women to nurse, but he refused to take nourishment from any of them. The mouth destined to speak with God might not take unclean milk. Bithiah, therefore, gave him to his mother to nurse.

Another legend says that he did not take any milk from his breasts. Bithiah then adopted him as her son. Aside from the name "Moses" which Bithiah gave to him, he had seven names, or according to other stories ten, other names given to him by his mother, his father, his brother Aaron, his sister Miriam, his nurse, his grandfather Kehat, and Israel. These names were: Jared, Abi Gedor, Ḥeber, Abi Soko, Jekuthiel, Abi Zanoah, and Shemaiah ("Shama 'Yah" meaning "God has heard"), the last one being given to him by Israel. He was also called "Heman".

Moses was a very large child at the age of three. At this age, sitting at the king's table in the presence of several princes and counselors, he took the crown from Pharaoh's head and placed it on his own. The princes were horrified at the boy's act, and the soothsayer said that this was the same boy who, by their former predictions, would destroy the kingdom of Pharaoh and liberate Israel. Balaam and Jethro were at that time also among the king's counselors. Balaam advised the king to kill the boy at once, but Jethro (other sources say it was Gabriel in the guise of one of the king's counselors) noted that the boy should first be examined, to see whether he had sense enough to have done such an act intentionally. All agreed with this advice. A shining piece of gold, a precious stone, and a live coal was placed on a plate before the boy to see which of the two he would choose. The angel Gabriel then guided his hand to the coal, which he took up and put into his mouth. This burned his tongue, causing him difficulty in speaking; but it saved his life.

Moses remained in Pharaoh's house fifteen years longer. According to the Book of Jubilees, he learned the Ashuri script from his father, Amram. During his sojourn in the king's palace, he often went to his brethren, the slaves of the Pharaoh, to share their sad lot. He helped anyone who bore a heavy burden or was too weak for his work. He reminded Pharaoh that an enslaved person was entitled to some rest and begged him to grant the Israelites one free day in the week. Pharaoh acceded to this request, and Moses accordingly instituted Shabbat as a day of rest for the Israelites.

=== Flight from Egypt ===
Moses' killing of the Egyptian was not considered murder, for the Egyptian merited death because he had forced an Israelite woman to commit adultery with him. Moses was at that time eighteen years of age. According to another version, Moses was then twenty, or possibly forty, years of age. These divergent opinions regarding his age at the time when he killed the Egyptian are based upon different estimates of the length of his stay in the royal palace, both of them assuming that he fled from Egypt immediately after the slaying.

Dathan and Abiram were bitter enemies of Moses, insulting him and saying he should not act as if he were a member of the royal house since he was the son not of Bithiah, but of Jochebed. Previous to this, they had slandered him before Pharaoh. Pharaoh had forgiven Moses for everything else but would not forgive him for killing the Egyptian. He delivered him to the executioner, who chose a very sharp sword with which to kill Moses, but the latter's neck became like a marble pillar, dulling the edge of the sword. Meanwhile, the angel Michael descended from Heaven and took the form of the executioner, giving the latter the shape of Moses and so killing him. He then took up Moses and carried him beyond the frontier of Egypt for a distance of three, or, according to another account, of forty days. According to another legend, the angel took the shape of Moses and allowed himself to be caught, thus allowing the real Moses to escape.

=== King in Ethiopia ===
The fugitive Moses went to the camp of King Nikanos, or Kikanos, of Ethiopia, who was at that time besieging his own capital, which had been traitorously seized by Balaam and his sons and made impregnable by them through magic. Moses joined the army of Nikanos, and the king and all his generals took a fancy to him because he was as courageous as a lion, and his face gleamed like the sun.

When Moses spent nine years in the army, King Nikanos died, and the Hebrews were made general. He took the city, driving out Balaam and his sons Jannes and Jambres, and was proclaimed king by the Ethiopians. He was obliged, in deference to the wishes of the people, to marry Nikanos' widow, Adoniya, with whom he did not, however, cohabit. Miriam and Aaron spoke against Moses on account of the Cushite (Ethiopian) woman whom he had married. He became king at age 27 and ruled Ethiopia for 40 years, considerably increasing the country's power. After forty years, his wife, Queen Adoniya, accused him before the princes and generals of not having cohabited with her during the many years of their marriage and of never having worshiped the Ethiopian gods. She called upon the princes not to suffer a stranger among them as king but to make her son by Nikanos, Munahas, or Munakaros, king. The princes complied with her wishes but dismissed Moses in peace, giving him great treasures. Moses, now 67 years old, went from Ethiopia to Midian.

According to Josephus's account of this story (see Moses in Hellenistic literature), after Moses's marriage to the daughter of the Ethiopian king, he did not become King of Ethiopia but led his troops back to Egypt, where he remained. The Egyptians and even the Pharaoh were envious of his glorious deeds, fearing that he might also use his power to gain dominion over Egypt. They, therefore, sought how they might assassinate him, and Moses, learning of the plot, fled to Midian. This narrative of Josephus' agrees with two aggadic accounts, according to which Moses fled from Egypt directly to Midian, not staying in Ethiopia at all. These accounts are as follows: (1) Moses lived for twenty years in Pharaoh's house; he then went to Midian, where he remained for sixty years when he undertook the mission of liberating Israel as a man of eighty years. (2) Moses lived for forty years in Pharaoh's house; thence he went to Midian, where he stayed for forty years until his mission was entrusted to him.

=== In Midian ===
Upon arriving at Midian, Moses told his whole story to Jethro, who recognized him as the man destined to destroy the Egyptians. Therefore, he took Moses prisoner to deliver him to Pharaoh. According to another legend, Jethro took him for an Ethiopian fugitive and intended to deliver him to the Ethiopians. He kept him prisoner for seven or ten years.

Both of these legends are based on another legend: Moses was 77 years old when Jethro liberated him. According to the legend, which says that he went to Nikanos's camp at the age of thirty and ruled over Ethiopia for forty years, he was only seven years in Jethro's hands (30 plus 40 plus 7 equals 77). According to the other legend, he was eighteen when he fled Egypt; he remained for nine years in the camp of Nikanos and was king over Ethiopia for forty years. Hence, he must have been Jethro's captive for ten years or till his seventy-seventh year.

Moses was imprisoned in a deep dungeon in Jethro's house and received only small portions of bread and water as food. He would have died of hunger had not Zipporah, to whom Moses had before his captivity made an offer of marriage by the well, devised a plan by which she no longer went out to pasture the sheep but remained at home to attend to the household, being thereby enabled to supply Moses with food without her father's knowledge. After ten (or seven) years, Zipporah reminded her father that he had at one time cast a man into the dungeon, who must have died long ago, but if he were still living, he must be a just man whom God had kept alive by a miracle. Jethro went to the dungeon and called Moses, who answered immediately. As Jethro found Moses praying, he believed he had been saved by a miracle and liberated him.

Jethro had planted in his garden a marvelous rod, which had been created on the sixth day of the Creation, on Friday afternoon, and had been given to Adam. This curious rod had been handed down through Enoch, Shem, Abraham, Isaac, and Jacob to Joseph, at whose death it came into the possession of Pharaoh's court. Jethro, who saw it there, stole it and planted it in his garden. On the rod were engraved the Tetragrammaton and the initials of the ten plagues destined for Egypt. Jethro asked everyone who wished to marry one of his daughters to pull up the rod, but no suitor had succeeded. On being set at liberty, Moses walked in the garden, saw the rod, and read the inscription. He easily pulled it from the ground and used it for a staff. Jethro thereby recognized Moses as the deliverer of Israel and gave him the virtuous Zipporah as a wife, together with much money. Jethro stipulated that the first-born son of the marriage should adopt Jethro's pagan belief, while all the other children might be reared as Jews, and Moses agreed to it. According to Midrash Vayosha, one-half of the children of this marriage were to belong to Judaism and one-half to paganism. When, therefore, his son Gershom—who subsequently became the father of Jonathan—was born, Moses, under his agreement with Jethro, could not circumcise him.

Moses, therefore, went with his wife and child (another version says that both of his sons were then already born) to Egypt. On the way, he met Satan, or Mastema, as he is called in the Book of Jubilees, in the guise of a serpent, which proceeded to swallow Moses, and had ingested the upper part of his body, when he stopped. Zipporah seeing this, concluded that the serpent's action was because her son had not been circumcised, after that she circumcised him and smeared some of the blood on Moses's feet. A heavenly voice was then heard commanding the serpent to disgorge the half-swallowed Moses immediately. When Moses came to Egypt, he met his old enemies Dathan and Abiram, and when they asked him what he was seeking in Egypt, he immediately returned to Midian.

=== At the burning bush ===
As the shepherd of his father-in-law, he drove his sheep far into the desertExodus 3:1 to prevent the sheep from grazing in fields not belonging to Jethro. Here God appeared to him and addressed him for seven consecutive days. Moses, however, refused to listen because he would not allow himself to be disturbed in the work he paid for. Then God caused the flaming bush to appear to divert Moses's attention from his work. The under-shepherds with Moses saw nothing of the marvelous spectacle, which Moses alone beheld. Moses then interrupted his work and stepped nearer the bush to investigate. As Moses was at this time entirely inexperienced in prophecy, God, in calling him, imitated the voice of Amram so as not to frighten him. Moses, who thought that his father, Amram, was appearing to him, said: "What does my father wish?" God answered: "I am the God of thy father", and gave him the mission to save Israel. Moses hesitated to accept the mission chiefly because he feared that his elder brother, Aaron, who until then had been the only prophet in Israel, might feel slighted if his younger brother became the savior of the people; after that God assured him that Aaron would be glad of it. According to another version, Moses said to God: "You promised Jacob that You Yourself would liberate Israel, not appointing a mediator." God answered: "I myself will save them, but go thou first and announce to My children that I will do so." Moses consented and went to his father-in-law, Jethro, to obtain permission to leave Midian, for he had promised not to leave Midian without his sanction.

Moses departed with his wife and children and met Aaron, who told him it was not right to take them into Egypt since the attempt was being made to lead the Israelites out of that country. He, therefore, sent his wife and children back to Midian.

=== Confrontation with Pharaoh ===
When they went to Pharaoh, Moses went ahead, Aaron following, because Moses was more highly regarded in Egypt. Otherwise, Aaron and Moses were equally prominent and respected.

At the Egyptian royal palace entrance were two leopards, which would not allow anyone to approach unless their guards quieted them, but when Moses came, they played with him and fawned upon him as if they were his dogs. According to another version, guards were at every entrance. Gabriel, however, introduced Moses and Aaron into the palace's interior without being seen. As Moses's appearance before Pharaoh resulted only in increasing the tasks of the children of Israel, Moses returned to Midian; according to one version, he took his wife and children back at the same time.

After staying six months in Midian, he returned to Egypt, where he was subjected to many insults and injuries at the hands of Dathan and Abiram. This, together with the fear that he had aggravated the condition of the children of Israel, confused his mind so that he uttered disrespectful words to God. Justice (Middat ha-Din) wished to punish him for this, but as God knew that Moses's sorrow for Israel had induced these words he allowed Mercy (Middat ha-Rachamim) to prevail. As Moses feared that Middat ha-Din might prevent the redemption of Israel since it was unworthy of being redeemed, God swore to him to redeem the people for Moses's sake.

=== The plagues ===
In dealing with Pharaoh, Moses always showed him respect due to a king. Moses was really the one selected to perform all the miracles, but as he himself was doubtful of his success, some of them were assigned to Aaron. According to another version, Aaron and not Moses undertook to send the plagues and to perform all the miracles connected with the water and the dust. Because the water had saved Moses, and the dust had been useful to him in concealing the body of the Egyptian, it was not fitting that they should be the instruments of evil in Moses's hand.

When Moses announced the last plague, he would not state the exact time of its appearance, saying merely ka-chatzot ("about midnight"), because he thought the people might make a mistake in the time and would then call him a liar. On the night of The Exodus, when Moses had killed his paschal lamb, all the winds of the world were blowing through paradise, carrying away its perfumes and imparting them to Moses's lamb so that the odor of it could be detected at a distance of forty days. During this night, all the first-born, including the female first-born, were killed, except Pharaoh's daughter Bithiah, who had adopted Moses. Although she was a first-born child, she was saved through Moses's prayer.

=== The Exodus ===
During the Exodus, while all the people thought only of taking the gold and silver of the Egyptians, Moses endeavored to carry away boards for use in the construction of the future Temple, and to remove Joseph's coffin. Serah, Asher's daughter, told Moses that the coffin had been lowered into the Nile; after that, Moses went to the bank of the river and cried: "Come up, Joseph" (according to another version, he wrote the name of God on a slip of paper, which he threw into the Nile), when the coffin immediately rose to the surface. Another legend says that Joseph's coffin was among the royal tombs, the Egyptians guarding it with dogs whose barking could be heard throughout Egypt; but Moses silenced the dogs and took the coffin out.

On arriving at the Red Sea, Moses said to God when commanded by God to cleave the water: "You have made it a law of nature that the sea shall never be dry," God replied that at the Creation God had agreed with the sea as to the separation of its waters at this time.

When the Israelites saw Pharaoh and his army drown in the Red Sea, they wished to return to Egypt and set up a kingdom there, but Moses prevented them, urging them on by force. He also removed the idols which the Israelites had brought with them from Egypt.

=== Receiving the Torah ===
Giving the tablets of the Law and the Torah in general to Moses is a favorite subject for legends. In contrast to the pithy sentence of Rabbi Jose to the effect that Moses never ascended into Heaven, there are many aggadot that describe in detail how Moses made his ascension and received the Torah there.

Moses went up in a cloud that entirely enveloped him. As he could not penetrate the cloud, God took hold of him and placed him within it. When he reached heaven, the angels asked God: "What does this man, born of woman, desire among us?" God replied that Moses had come to receive the Torah, and after that, the angels claimed that God ought to give the Torah to them and not to men. Then God told Moses to answer them.

Moses was afraid that the angels might burn him with the breath of their mouths, but God told him to take hold of the throne of glory. Moses then proved to the angels that the Torah was not suited to them since they had no passion to be subdued by it. The angels became very friendly with Moses, each one giving him something.

The Angel of Death confided to him that incense would prevent the plague. Moses subsequently caused Aaron to employ this preventive knowledge. Moses, following the custom of the angels, ate nothing during his forty days' sojourn in Heaven, feeding only on the splendor of the Shekinah. He distinguished day from night by the fact that God instructed him by day in the Torah and by night in the Mishnah. God taught him also everything which every student would discover in the course of time. When Moses first learned the Torah, he soon forgot it; it was then bestowed upon him as a gift, and he did not again forget it.

=== The people worship the Golden Calf ===
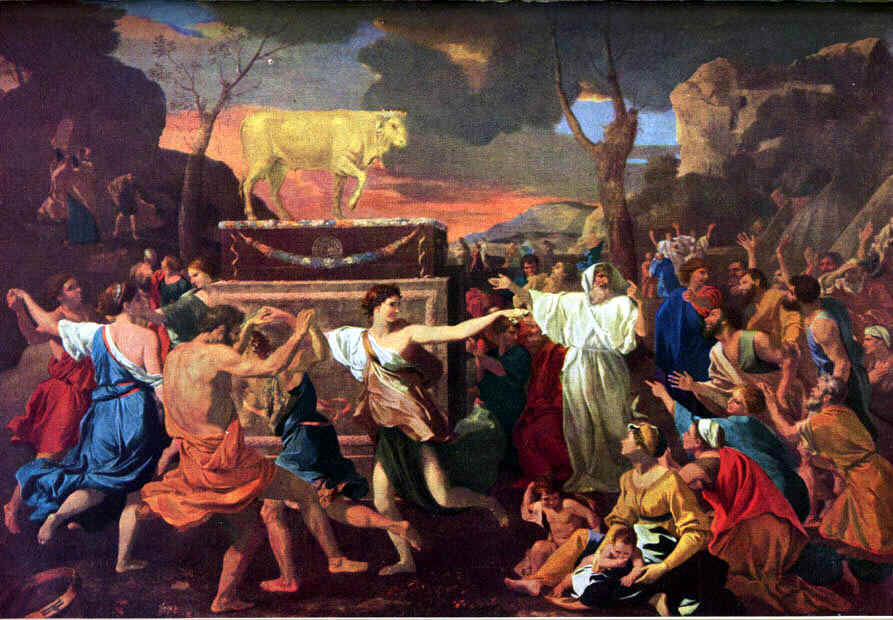
The Adoration of the Golden Calf by Nicolas Poussin: imagery influenced by the Greco-Roman bacchanal

The Torah was intended originally only for Moses and his descendants, but he was liberal enough to give it to the people of Israel; God approved the gift. According to another version, God gave the Torah to the Israelites for Moses's sake. Moses's burnt tongue was healed when he received the Law.

As Moses was writing down the Torah, upon reaching the passage "Let us make man", he said to God, "Why dost thou give the heretics the opportunity of construing these words to mean a plurality of gods?" After that, God replied: "Let those err that will". When Moses saw God write the words erekh appayim ("long-suffering"; see Exodus 34:6) and asked whether God was long-suffering toward the pious only, God answered, "Toward sinners also." When Moses said that sinners ought to perish, God answered, "You yourself will soon ask me to be long-suffering toward sinners". This happened soon after Israel had made the Golden calf. Before Moses ascended to Heaven, he said he would descend on the forenoon of the forty-first day. On that day, Satan confused the world so that it appeared to be an afternoon to the Israelites. Satan told them that Moses had died and was thus prevented from punctually fulfilling his promise. He showed them a form resembling Moses suspended in the air; the people then made the golden calf. When, in consequence of this, Moses was obliged to descend from Heaven, he saw the angels of destruction who were ready to destroy him. He was afraid of them, for he had lost his power over the angels when the people made the golden calf. God, however, protected him.

When Moses came down from Mount Sinai with the tablets and saw the calf, he said to himself: "If I now give to the people the tablets, on which the interdiction against idolatry is written, they will deserve death for having made and worshiped the golden calf." In compassion for the Israelites, he broke the tablets so that they might not be held responsible for having transgressed the commandment against idolatry. Moses then began to pray for the people, showing his heroic, unselfish love for them. Gathering from the words "let me" that Israel's fate depended on him and his prayer, he defended them before God. He said that Israel, having been sojourning in Egypt where idolatry flourished, had become accustomed to this kind of worship and could not easily be brought to desist from it. Moreover, God had afforded the people the means of making the golden calf since God had given them much gold and silver. Furthermore, God had not forbidden Israel to practice idolatry; the singular, not the plural, was used in Exodus 20:2-5—referring, therefore, only to Moses.

=== Moses and Israel ===
Moses refused God's offer to make him the ancestor of a great people since he was afraid that it would be said that the leader of Israel had sought his own glory and advantage and not that of the people. He, in fact, delivered himself to death for the people. For the love of the Israelites he went so far as to count himself among the sinners, saying to God: "This calf might be an assistant God and help in ruling the world." When God reproved him for having gone astray and with believing in the golden calf, he said: "Lord, why doth thy wrath wax hot against thy people".

Moses loved the people, showing affection on every occasion. During the battle with Amalek, he sat on a stone and not on a cushion, which he could easily have procured because Israel was at that time in trouble, so he intended to show that he suffered with them. When he begged God, before his death, to recall the oath that he (Moses) should never enter the land of Israel, God replied, "If I recall this oath I will also recall the oath never to destroy Israel," after which Moses said: "Rather let Moses and a thousand like him perish than that one of the people of Israel should perish". Moses requested that the Shekinah might rest in Israel only so that Israel might thereby be distinguished among all peoples, and if they sinned and were penitent, their intentional sins might be regarded merely as trespasses. Also that when Israel should suffer under the yoke of the nations, God would protect the pious of Israel. All the injuries and slanders heaped upon Moses by the people did not lessen his love for them.

The words "They looked after Moses" are differently interpreted. According to one opinion, the people praised Moses: "Hail to the mother who has borne him; all the days of his life God speaks with him; and he is dedicated to the service of God." According to another opinion, they reproached and reviled him: they accused him of committing adultery with another man's wife, and every man became jealous and forbade his wife to speak to Moses. They said: "See how fat and strong he has grown; he eats and drinks what belongs to the Jews, and everything that he has is taken from the people. Shall a man who has managed the building of the Tabernacle not become rich?". Yet Moses was the most conscientious of superintendents, and though he had been given sole charge of the work, he always caused his accounts to be examined by others. He was always among the workers, showing them how to do the work.

=== In the Tabernacle ===
Moses set up the Tabernacle alone when everything was prepared. He fastened the ceiling of the tent over it, as he was the only one able to do so, being ten ells tall. During the seven days of the dedication, he took the Tabernacle apart daily and set it up again without help. When all was completed, he gave a detailed account of the various expenses. During the seven days of the dedication, or (according to another account) during the forty years of wandering in the desert, Moses officiated as a high priest. He was also king during this entire period. When he demanded these two offices for his descendants, God told him that the office of the king was destined for David and his house, while the office of high priest was reserved for Aaron and his descendants.

=== Inability to enter the Land of Israel ===
Whenever the cup is handed to Moses during the banquet of the pious in the other world, that he may say grace over the meal, he declares: "I am not worthy to say grace, as I have not deserved to enter the land of Israel". The fact that Moses, the foremost leader of Israel, who ceaselessly prayed for it and partook of its sorrows, and on whose account the manna was showered down from Heaven and the protecting clouds and the marvelous well returned after the death of Aaron and Miriam, should not be allowed to share in Israel's joys and enter the Promised Land, was a problem that puzzled the aggadah, for which it tried to find various explanations. Moses was anxious to enter the Promised Land solely because many of the commandments given by God could be observed only there, and he was desirous of fulfilling all the commandments. God, however, said that God looked upon Moses as having fulfilled all the commandments and would, therefore, reward him accordingly. Moses prayed in vain to be permitted to go into the Promised Land, if only for a little while, for God had decreed that he should not enter the country either alive or dead. According to one opinion, this decree was in punishment for the words addressed by him to God: "Wherefore hast thou so evil entreated this people?" According to another version, this punishment was inflicted upon him for having once silently renounced his nationality. When Moses had helped the daughters of Jethro at the well, they took him home, letting him wait outside. At the same time, they went into the house. They told their father that an Egyptian had protected them. Moses, who overheard this conversation, did not correct them, concealing the fact that he was a Hebrew. There is still another explanation, to the effect that it would not have redounded to the glory of Moses if he who had led 600,000 persons out of Egypt had been the only one to enter Israel, while the entire people were destined to die in the desert. Again, Moses had to die with the generation he took out of Egypt so he might be able to lead them again in the future world.

Denying all these reasons, another explanation, based on the scriptures, is that Moses and Aaron were not permitted to enter the Promised Land because they did not have the proper confidence in God to call water from the rock. Moses asked that this error should be recorded in the Torah (Numbers 20:12) so that no other errors or faults should be ascribed to him. This story of his lack of true confidence in God when calling forth the water is elaborated with many details in the legends. Moses was careful not to provoke the people during the forty years of wandering in the desert because God had sworn that none of the generations that had left Egypt should behold the promised land. When he went to call forth the water, he did not know exactly from which rock it would come. The people became impatient and said there was no difference between the rocks and that he ought to be able to call forth water from any one of them. Vexed, he replied, "Ye rebels!" or, according to the Midrash, "fools!" (μῶροι). God, therefore, said to him: "As thou art clever, thou shalt not enter the land together with fools." According to another legend, Moses became angry because some of the people said that, since he had been a herdsman with Jethro, he knew, like all herders, where to find water in the desert and that now he was merely trying to deceive the people and to make them believe that he had miraculously called water from the rock.

=== At Aaron's Death ===
When Moses heard that Aaron also had to die, he grieved and wept so much as to cause his own death. This story, as well as the reference to his early death, was probably based on Deuteronomy 34:7, according to which he retained all his faculties and his full strength down to his end. Still, they contradict the many other versions of his death (see below). When Moses took Aaron up the mountain where the latter was to die, and announced his death to him, he comforted him, saying: "You, my brother, will die and leave your office to your children; but when I die a stranger will inherit my office. When you die you will leave me to look after your burial; when I die I shall leave no brother, no sister, and no son to bury me"—for Moses's sons died before him. When Moses witnessed the quiet and peaceful death of Aaron he desired a similar death for himself. After Aaron's death, the people accused Moses of having killed him through jealousy, but God cleared him from this suspicion by a miracle.

When Moses was about to take vengeance on Midian before his death, he did not himself take part in the war against the Midianites because he had at one time sojourned in Midian and had received benefits in that country. When Zimri brought the Midianite woman Cozbi before Moses, asking that he might marry her, and Moses refused his request, Zimri reproached him with having himself married the Midianite woman Zipporah. Later, also, Moses was criticized for this marriage, the Rabbis saying that on account of it, he became the ancestor of Jonathan, the priest of Micah's idol. God revealed to Moses before his death all the coming generations, their leaders and sages, and the saints and sinners. When Moses saw Saul and his sons die by the sword, he grieved that the first king of Israel should come to such a sad end. When God showed him Hell, he began to be afraid of it, but God promised him that he should not go there. He beheld Paradise also. A detailed description of Moses's wanderings through Paradise and Hell is found in the apocalypse "Gedullat Mosheh".

=== Death of Moses ===
The different legends agree that Moses died on Adar 7 (also his birthday) at the age of 120 years, the angel of death not being present. But the earlier and the later legends differ considerably in the description and the details of this event. The earlier ones present the hero's death as a worthy close to his life. It miraculously takes place, and the hero meets it quietly and resignedly. He ascends Mount Abarim accompanied by the elders of the people, and Joshua and Eleazar; and while he is talking with them, a cloud suddenly surrounds him, and he disappears. He was prompted by modesty to say in the Torah that he died a natural death in order that people should not say that God had taken him alive into Heaven on account of his piety. The event is described somewhat differently, but equally simply, in Sifre.

For the statement that Moses did not die at all, compare Sotah 13b. "When the angel of death, being sent by God to Moses, appeared before him and said, 'Give me your soul,' Moses scolded him, saying, 'You have not even the right to appear where I am sitting; how dare you say to me that I shall give you my soul?' The angel of death took this answer back to God. And when God said to the angel the second time, 'Bring Me the soul of Moses,' he went to the place where Moses had been, but the latter had left. Then he went to the sea to look for Moses there. The sea said that it had not seen Moses since the time when he had led the children of Israel through it. Then he went to the mountains and valleys, which told him that God had concealed Moses, keeping him for the life in the future world, and no creature knew where he was."

=== His wishes to avoid death ===
When God told Moses that he must die, Moses replied: "Must I die now, after all the trouble I have had with the people? I have beheld their sufferings; why should I not also behold their joys? Thou hast written in the Torah: 'At his day thou shalt give him his hire' why dost thou not give me the reward of my toil?" God assured him that he should receive his reward in the future world. Moses then asked why he must die at all, at which point God enumerated some of the sins for which he had deserved death, one of them being the murder of the Egyptian.

According to another version, Moses had to die so that he might not be taken for a god. Moses then began to become excited, saying he would live like the beasts of the field and the birds, which get their daily food only for the sake of remaining alive. He desired to renounce the entry into the Promised Land and stay with the tribes of Reuben and Gad in the country east of the Jordan if only he might remain alive. God said that this could not be done since the people would leave Joshua and return to him.

Moses then begged that one of his children or one of the children of his brother Aaron might succeed him. God answered that his children had not devoted themselves to the Law, whereas Joshua had served Moses faithfully and had learned from him; he, therefore, deserved to succeed his teacher.

Then Moses said: "Perhaps I must die only because the time has come for Joshua to enter upon his office as the leader of Israel. If Joshua shall now become the leader, I will treat him as my teacher and will serve him, if only I may stay alive." Moses then began to serve Joshua and honor him as a master from his pupil. He continued to do this for thirty-seven days, from the first of Shevat to the seventh of Adar. On the latter day, he took Joshua to the tent of the assembly. But when he saw Joshua go in while he had to remain outside, he became jealous and said it was a hundred times better to die than to suffer such pangs of jealousy. Then, the treasures of wisdom were taken away from Moses and given to Joshua. A heavenly voice was heard to say, "Learn from Joshua!" Joshua delivered a speech of which Moses understood nothing. Then, when the people asked that Moses should complete the Torah, he replied, "I do not know how to answer you," and tottered and fell. He said, "Lord of the world, until now I desired to live; but now I am willing to die." As the angel of death was afraid to take his soul, God, accompanied by Gabriel, Michael, and Zagziel, the former teacher of Moses, descended to get it. Moses blessed the people, begged their forgiveness for any injuries he might have done them, and took leave of them with the assurance that he would see them again at the resurrection of the dead.

Gabriel arranged the couch, Michael spread a silken cover over it, and Zagziel put a silken pillow under Moses's head. At God's command, Moses crossed his hands over his breast and closed his eyes, and God took his soul away with a kiss (mitat neshika). Then Heaven and Earth and the starry world began to weep for Moses.

Although Moses died in the territory of the tribe of Reuben, he was buried in that of tribe of Gad at a spot four miles distant from the place of his death. He was carried this distance by the Shekinah, while the angels said to him that he had practiced God's justice (Deuteronomy 33:22). At the same time, the bat kol cried out in the camp of the people: "Moses, the great teacher of Israel, is dead!"

God buried Moses in a grave which had been prepared for him in the dusk of Friday, the sixth day of the Creation. This tomb is opposite Beth-peor in atonement for the sin which Israel committed with the idol Peor. Yet it cannot be discovered; for to a person standing on the mountain it seems to be in the valley; and if one goes down into the valley, it appears to be on the mountain.

== Personal qualities ==
All the different cycles of legends agree in saying that Moses was very wealthy, probably on the basis of Numbers 16.15; they differ, however, as to the source of his wealth. According to one, he derived it from the presents and treasures given to him by the Ethiopians when they took the crown away from him. According to another, Jethro gave him a large sum of money as dowry when he married Zipporah. Still another story relates that Moses received a large part of the booty captured from Pharaoh and, later, from Sihon and Og. In two other versions, Moses became wealthy by a miracle. One says that Moses became rich through the breaking of the tablets, which were made of sapphires; in the other, God created a sapphire quarry in Moses' tent.

Moses was also distinguished for his strength and beauty. He was, as stated above, ten ells tall and very powerful. In the battle against Og, Moses was the only one able to kill that king. His face was surrounded by a halo; this was given to him in reward for having hidden his face on first meeting God in the burning bush, or he derived it from the cave in the cleft of the rock or from the tablets, which he grasped while God was holding one side and the angels the other. Another legend says that a drop of the marvelous ink with which he wrote down the Torah remained on the pen; and when he touched his head with the pen he received his halo.

Moses was called the "father of wisdom" on account of his great sagacity. He possessed forty-nine of the fifty divisions of wisdom. The question why the pious sometimes have bad luck while the sinners are fortunate was solved for him. He wished to know also how good deeds are rewarded in the future world, but this was not revealed to him.

Piety was not burdensome to him. His prayers were immediately answered. He was so prominent a figure that his authority was equal to that of an entire sanhedrin of seventy-one members, or even of the whole of Israel.

=== His prophetic powers ===
Aside from the Torah, Moses wrote also the Book of Job and some Psalms, and introduced many regulations and institutions. On account of the excellence of his prophecy he is called "the father," "the head," "the master," and "the chosen of the Prophets". While all the other prophets ceased to prophesy after a time, Moses continued to talk with God and to prophesy throughout his life; and while all the other prophets beheld their visions as through nine spectacles (espaklarya) or through dim ones, Moses beheld his as through one clear, finely ground glass. Balaam surpassed him in prophecy in two respects: (1) Balaam always knew when God was about to speak with him, while Moses did not know beforehand when God would speak with him; and (2) Balaam could speak with God whenever he wished, which Moses could not do. According to another tradition, however, Moses also could speak with God as often as he wished. The fact that God would speak with him unawares induced Moses to give up domestic life, and to live separated from his wife.

=== His modesty ===
Moses' modesty is illustrated by many fine examples in aggadah. When God pointed to Rabbi Akiva and his scholarship, Moses said: "If You have such a man, why do You reveal the Torah through me?". When Moses descended from heaven, Satan came to ask him where the Torah was which God had given to him. Moses said: "Who am I? Am I worthy to receive the Torah from God?" When God asked him why he denied that the Torah had been given to him, he replied: "How can I claim anything which belongs to You and is Your darling?" Then God said to him: "As you are so modest and humble, the Torah shall be called after you, the 'Torah of Moses'".

Moses' modesty never allowed him to put himself forward (e.g., in liberating Israel, in dividing the sea, and subsequently also in connection with the Tabernacle) until God said to him: "How long wilt thou count thyself so lowly? The time is ready for thee; thou art the man for it". When Moses had made a mistake, or had forgotten something, he was not ashamed to admit it. In his prayers he always referred to the merits of others, although everything was granted to him on account of his own merit.

== See also ==
- Moses in Judeo-Hellenistic literature
- Moses in Islam
