= Philo (poet) =

Philo was a Greek poet and writer. He was a Hellenistic Jewish author of an epic poem in Greek hexameters on the history of Jerusalem. He lived at an earlier date than Philo the philosopher. Alexander Polyhistor (c. 105-35 B.C.) quotes several passages of the poem, and is the source of the extracts in Eusebius (Praeparatio evangelica, ix. 20, 24, 37). This is probably the Philo who is mentioned by Clemens Alexandrinus (Strom, i. 21, 141) and by Josephus (Contra Apionem, i. 23), who calls him "the elder".
