= Cleodemus Malchus =

Ancient Jewish scholar

Cleodemus Malchus (fl. 200 BCE) was a Jewish writer of whom only a few lines survive. He connects the inhabitants of Syria and North Africa with Abraham by identifying them as descendants of three sons whom Abraham had by Keturah: Apheran (the town of Aphra), Asoureim (the Assyrians), and Iaphran (Africa). His work appears cited in a quote from Alexander Polyhistor referenced by Josephus in Antiquities of the Jews 1.239-41.

Josephus was cited by Eusebius in his Praeparatio Evangelica 9.20-2.4. According to Robert Doran, "the two texts show minor variations."
