= Epher =

Figure in the Book of Genesis

Epher (Hebrew: עֵפֶר ʿĒp̄er) was according to Gen. 25:4 a descendant of Abraham and the second son of Midian, therefore, a grandson of Abraham through his wife Keturah.

According to the Antiquities of the Jews by Flavius Josephus, the descendants of Epher migrated westward and eventually conquered present-day Northwest Africa. Josephus claimed that the name 'Africa' itself was derived etymologically from the name Epher.

In another layer of post-biblical tradition, the Hellenistic Judean historian Cleodemus Malchus, whose work is preserved in fragments by later writers such as Alexander Polyhistor and Eusebius, claimed that Epher’s daughter married the mythological hero Heracles.
