= Keturah =

Biblical character

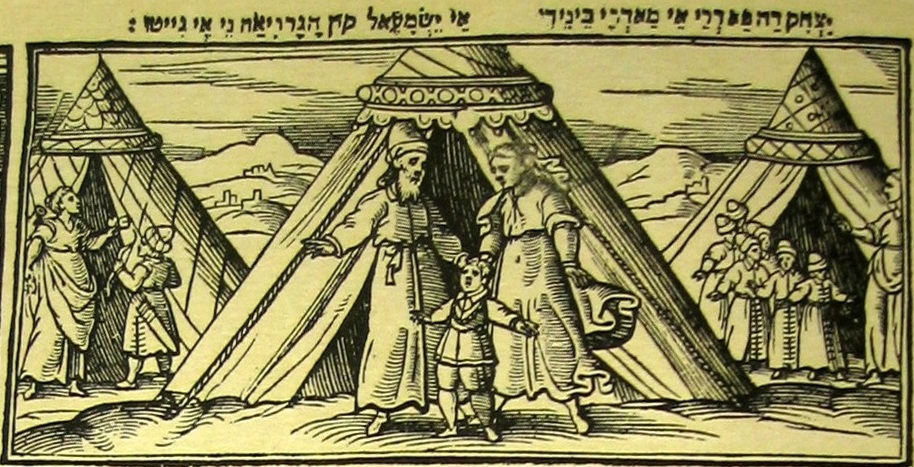
- The wives and sons of Abraham, with Keturah standing at the far right with her six sons. From the 1630 Venice Haggadah.

In-universe information
- Spouse: Abraham
- Children: Zimran (son); Jokshan (son); Medan (son); Midian (son); Ishbak (son); Shuah (son)

Keturah (Hebrew: קְטוּרָה, Qəṭūrā, possibly meaning "incense"; (Arabic: قنطوراء، قنطورة، قطورة) was a wife and/or a concubine of the Biblical patriarch Abraham. According to the Book of Genesis, Abraham married Keturah after the death of his first wife, Sarah. Abraham and Keturah had six sons. According to some Jewish traditions, she was a descendant of Noah's son Japheth.

One modern commentator on the Hebrew Bible has called Keturah "the most ignored significant person in the Torah". The medieval Jewish commentator Rashi, and some previous rabbinical commentators, related a traditional belief that Keturah was the same person as Hagar, although this idea cannot be found in the biblical text. However, Hagar was Sarah's Egyptian maidservant.

== Sources ==
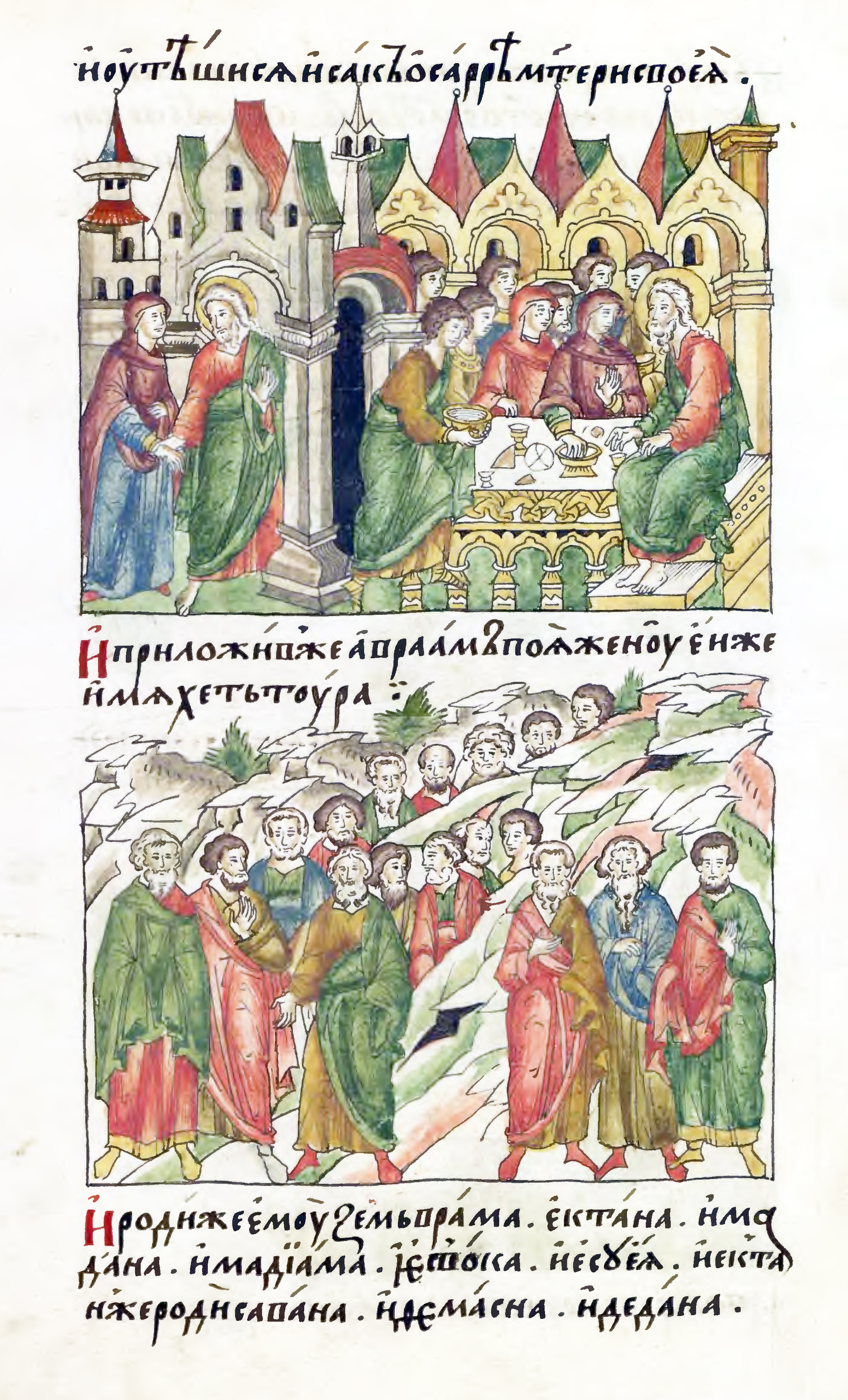
Keturah's wedding; her sons and grandsons

Keturah is mentioned in two passages of the Hebrew Bible: in the Book of Genesis, and in the First Book of Chronicles.

Additionally, she is mentioned in Antiquities of the Jews by the 1st-century Romano-Jewish historian Josephus, in the Talmud, the Midrash, the Targum on the Torah, the Genesis Rabbah, and various other writings of Jewish theologians and philosophers.

Louis Feldman has said "Josephus records evidence of the prolific non-Jewish polymath Alexander Polyhistor, who in turn cites the historian Cleodemus Malchus, who states that two of the sons of Abraham and Keturah joined Heracles' campaign in Africa, and that Heracles, without doubt the greatest Greek hero of them all, married the daughter of one of them."

According to the anthropologist Paula M. McNutt, it is generally recognized that there is nothing specific in the biblical traditions recorded in Genesis, including those regarding Abraham and his family, that can be definitively related to known history in or around Canaan in the early second millennium B.C.

== Relationship with Abraham ==
Keturah is referred to in Genesis 25:1 as "another wife" of Abraham (Hebrew: אִשָּה, romanized: 'išāh, lit. 'woman, wife'). In First Chronicles, she is called Abraham's "concubine", (Hebrew: פִּילֶגֶשׁ, romanized: pilegeš, lit. 'concubine') and Genesis 25:6 also refers to Abraham's concubines and their sons.

According to one opinion in the midrashic work Genesis Rabbah, Keturah and Hagar are names for the same person, whom Abraham remarried after initially expelling. This opinion was adopted and popularized by 11th-century scholar Rashi. Possible justifications for this opinion include the fact that Keturah is referred to 1 Chronicles 1:32 as Abraham's concubine (in the singular), and several other verses which suggest that the descendants of Hagar and Keturah lived in the same territory or formed a single ethnic group. However, this idea was rejected by another rabbi in Genesis Rabbah, as well as by traditional commentators such as Ibn Ezra, Nahmanides, and Rashbam. The Book of Jubilees also supports the conclusion that Keturah and Hagar were two different people, by stating that Abraham waited until after Sarah's death before marrying Keturah. According to modern scholar Richard Elliott Friedman, the identification of Keturah with Hagar has "no basis ... in the text".

Genesis Rabbah interprets the name Keturah in accordance with the opinion that she was identical to Hagar: the name was said to be related to the Aramaic ketur (knot) to imply that she was "bound" and did not have sexual relations with anyone else from the time she left Abraham until her return. The name Keturah was alternatively said to be derived from the ketoret (meaning "incense" in Hebrew).

== Descendants ==
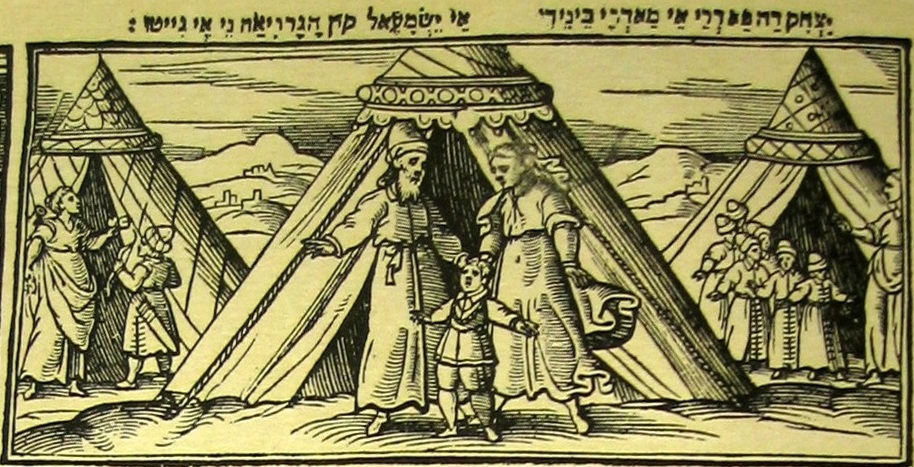
A portion of a page from the Venice Haggadah of 1609. Displays the three wives of Abraham and his sons. From the Yale University Library, "The image ... shows Abraham with the three women in his life. In the center are Sarah and Isaac; on the left are Hagar and Ishmael and on the right are Keturah and her children."

Keturah bore Abraham six sons: Zimran, Jokshan, Medan, Midian, Ishbak, and Shuah. Genesis and First Chronicles also list seven of her grandsons (Sheba, Dedan, Ephah, Epher, Hanoch, Abida, and Eldaah). Josephus writes that "Abraham contrived to settle them in colonies; and they took possession of Troglodytis, (Note: In this case the word is applied to the cave dwelling peoples of the Rift Valley.) and the country of Arabia Felix, as far as it reaches to the Red Sea." Genesis records that Abraham gave gifts to these "sons of his concubines" and sent them to the East, while making Isaac, son of Sarah, his primary heir. Keturah's sons were said to have represented the Arab tribes who lived south and east of Israel (Genesis 25:1–6). According to the Judean authors Josephus and Malchus, Punic people were descended from Epher.

According to the African (Igbo) writer Olaudah Equiano, the 18th-century English theologian John Gill believed the African people were descended from Abraham and Keturah. According to the Baháʼí author John Able, Baháʼís consider their founder, Bahá'u'lláh, to have been "descended doubly, from both Abraham and Sarah, and separately from Abraham and Keturah".

=== Zimran ===
Zimran has been tentatively identified by some with the Arabian town of Zabran, i.e. Jeddah, between Mecca and Medina. The biblical accounts in Genesis and I Chronicles do not mention Zimran's descendants, but according to the Book of Jasher, his children were Abihen, Molich and Narim.

Academics such as Jan Retsö and William Hazlitt have suggested that the descendants of Zimran are the same people known as Banizomenes, who were mentioned in the records of the Greek historian Diodorus Siculus.

=== Jokshan ===
Jokshan became the father of Sheba and Dedan. Dedan had three sons, named Asshurim, Letushim, and Leummim. In his "History of the Prophets and Kings", Tabari wrote that the wife of the North Arabian ancestor Adnan, Mahdad bint Laham, was a descendant of Jokshan (Yaqshan).

=== Medan ===
Medan (Hebrew: מְדָן Məḏān "contention; to twist, conflict"; also spelt Madan in the Vulgate and in Josephus' writings) was the third son of Abraham and Keturah. There is no known connection to neither the Madan people of Iran and Iraq, nor the city of Medan in North Sumatra, Indonesia.

=== Midian ===
Midian is generally considered ancestral to the Midianite people, found in later portions of the Hebrew scriptures. Some Muslim genealogists claim he was the son of Lot's daughter. Some Islamic scholars also place Midian as the father of Issachar, and Issachar as the father of Shu'ayb.

=== Ishbak ===
It has been argued that his descendants may be a group of people identified in a cuneiform inscription, known as Jasbuqu.

=== Shuah ===
Shuah seems to have turned northward and travelled into northern Mesopotamia, in what is now the northern region of modern-day Syria. As evidenced by cuneiform texts, the land seems to have been named after him, being known as the land of Sûchu which lies to the south of ancient Hittite capital of Carchemish on the Euphrates river. The Bible also records that Job's friend Bildad was a Shuhite.
