= Isaac =

Biblical patriarch, son of Abraham and Sarah

- יִצְחָק
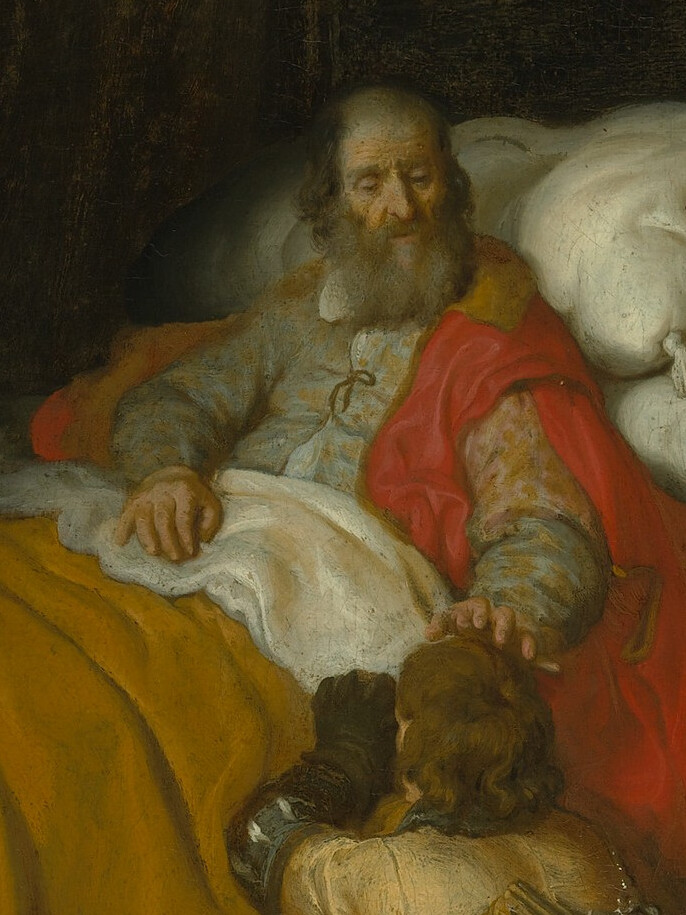
- Detail of Isaac from Isaac Blessing Jacob (1637) by Gerbrand van den Eeckhout
- Spouse: Rebecca (also spelled Rebekah)
- Children: Esau (older twin son); Jacob (younger twin son)
- Parents: Abraham (father); Sarah (mother)
- Family: Ishmael (half-brother, first born of Abraham, son of Hagar); Zimran (half-brother); Jokshan (half-brother); Medan (half-brother); Midian (half-brother); Ishbak (half-brother); Shuah (half-brother)

Isaac (Note: /ˈaɪzək/ EYE-zək; Biblical Hebrew: יִצְחָק, romanized: Yīṣḥāq; Ancient Greek: Ἰσαάκ, romanized: Isaák; Arabic: إسحٰق/إسحاق, romanized: Isḥāq; Classical Syriac: ܐܝܨܚܩ, romanized: Iṣḥāq; Amharic: ይስሐቅ) is the second Hebrew patriarch in Judaism and an important figure in the Abrahamic religions, including Samaritanism, Christianity, Islam, the Baháʼí Faith, and Rastafari. Isaac first appears in the Torah, in which he is the son of Abraham and Sarah, the father of Jacob and Esau, and the grandfather of the twelve tribes of Israel.

Isaac's name means "he will laugh", reflecting the laughter of Abraham and Sarah when they were told that they would have a child at their advanced ages. He is the only patriarch whose name was never changed, and the only one who did not move out of Canaan. According to the narrative, he died aged 180, the longest-lived of the three patriarchs.

Recent scholarship has discussed the possibility that Isaac could have originally been an ancestor from the Beersheba region who was venerated at a sanctuary.

== Etymology ==
The anglicized name "Isaac" is a transliteration of the Biblical Hebrew: יִצְחָק, romanized: Yiṣḥāq, which literally means "He laughs/will laugh". Ugaritic texts dating from the 13th century BCE refer to the benevolent smile of the Canaanite deity El. Genesis ascribes the laughter to Isaac's parents, Abraham and Sarah, instead. According to the biblical narrative, Abraham fell on his face and laughed when God (Hebrew, Elohim) imparted the news of their son's eventual birth. He laughed because Sarah was past the age of childbearing; both she and Abraham were advanced in age. Later, when Sarah overheard three messengers of the Lord renew the promise, she laughed inwardly for the same reason. Sarah denied laughing when God questioned Abraham about it.

== Genesis narrative ==
=== Birth ===
After God changes Abram and Sarai's names to Abraham and Sarah, he tells Abraham that he will bear a second son by Sarah named Isaac, with whom a new covenant would be established. In response, Abraham began to laugh, as both he and Sarah were well beyond natural child-bearing age. Some time later, three men who Abraham identifies as messengers of God visit him and Sarah, and Abraham treats them to food and niceties. They repeat the prophecy that Sarah would bear a child, promising Isaac's birth within a year's time, at which point Sarah laughs in disbelief. God questions why the pair laughed in disbelief at his words, and if it is because they believe such things were not within his power. Now afraid, they futilely deny ever having laughed at God's words.

Time passes as Isaac is born. Isaac was Abraham's second son and firstborn of Sarah who was then Sarai. Sarai had been barren for a long time and sought a way to fulfill God's promise that Abram would be father of many nations, especially since they had grown old, so she offered Hagar to Abram to be his concubine.

On the eighth day from his birth, Isaac was circumcised, as was necessary for all males of Abraham's household, in order to be in compliance with the Jewish covenant.

After Isaac had been weaned, Sarah saw Ishmael playing with or mocking him (the Hebrew term is ambiguous), and urged her husband to cast out Hagar the bondservant and her son, so that Isaac would be Abraham's sole heir. Abraham was hesitant, but at God's order he listened to his wife's request.

=== Binding ===
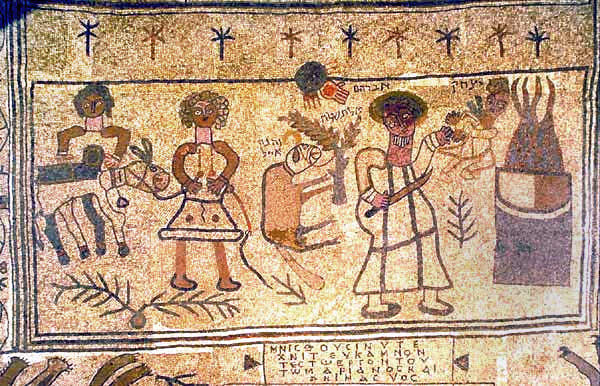
The Akedah (Binding), mosaic on the floor of Beit Alfa Synagogue

At some point in Isaac's youth, his father Abraham took him to Mount Moriah. At God's command as the last of ten trials to test his faith, Abraham was to build a sacrificial altar and sacrifice his son Isaac upon it. After he had bound his son to the altar and drawn his knife to kill him, at the last moment an angel of God prevented Abraham from proceeding. Instead, he was directed to sacrifice a nearby ram that was stuck in thickets.

=== Family life ===
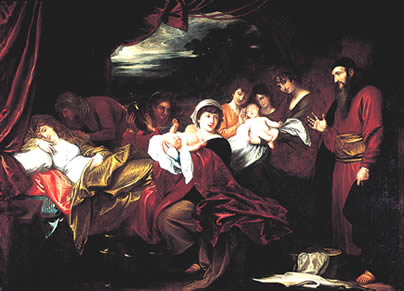
The birth of Esau and Jacob, as painted by Benjamin West

Before Isaac was 40, and when Abraham was advanced in years, the latter sent his chief steward into Mesopotamia to find a wife for Isaac, from his nephew Bethuel's family. The steward chose an Aramean woman, Rebekah, and brought her back to Isaac; in the biblical narrative, the steward refers to Isaac as "my master". Isaac married Rebekah, and on Abraham's death he inherited all his possessions, with the exception of some gifts which had been given to his six half-brothers, who had been sent to live "to the East to be away from Isaac".

After many years of marriage, Rebekah had still not given birth to a child and was believed to be barren. Isaac prayed for her and she conceived twins. They struggled with each other in her womb. Rebekah gave birth to twin boys, Esau and Jacob. Isaac was 60 years old when his two sons were born. Isaac favored Esau, and Rebekah favored Jacob.

The narratives about Isaac do not mention his having concubines.

=== Migration ===
Isaac moved to Beer-lahai-roi after his father died. When the land experienced famine, he moved to the Philistine land of Gerar where his father once lived. This land was still under the control of King Abimelech as it was in the days of Abraham. Like his father, Isaac also pretended that Rebekah was his sister due to fear that Abimelech would kill him in order to take her. He had gone back to all of the wells that his father dug and saw that they were all stopped up with earth. The Philistines did this after Abraham died. So, Isaac unearthed them and began to dig for more wells all the way to Beersheba, where he made a pact with Abimelech, just like in the day of his father.

=== Birthright ===
Isaac grew old and became blind. He called his son Esau and directed him to procure some venison for him, in order to receive Isaac's blessing. While Esau was hunting, Jacob, after listening to his mother's advice, deceived his blind father by misrepresenting himself as Esau and thereby obtained his father's blessing, such that Jacob became Isaac's primary heir and Esau was left in an inferior position. According to Genesis 25:29–34, Esau had previously sold his birthright to Jacob for "bread and stew of lentils". Thereafter, Isaac sent Jacob into Mesopotamia to take a wife of his mother's brother's house. After 20 years working for his uncle Laban, Jacob returned home. He reconciled with his twin brother Esau, then he and Esau buried their father, Isaac, in Hebron after he died at the age of 180.

=== Death and burial ===
Isaac was 180 years old when he died. He was buried by his sons.

== Traditional information ==
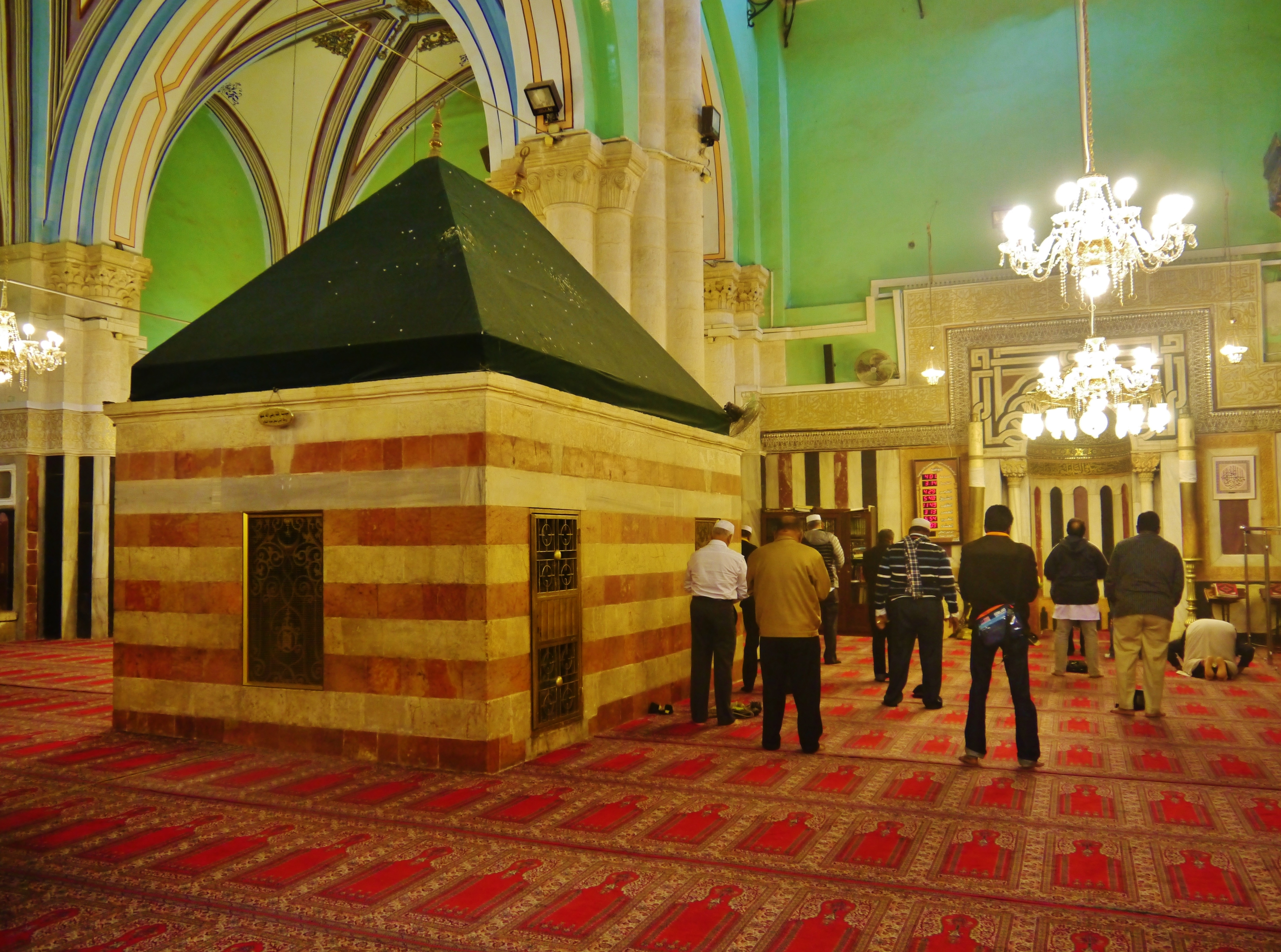
Tomb in the Cave of the Patriarchs, Hebron

The servant sent by Abraham to find a wife for Isaac is traditionally held to be Eliezer of Damascus, who in Genesis 15 is Abraham's steward and, at that time, his heir-apparent. He is not named in the narrative concerning Isaac.

According to local tradition, the graves of Isaac and Rebekah, along with the graves of Abraham and Sarah and Jacob and Leah, are in the Cave of the Patriarchs.

== Jewish views ==
While the Book of Genesis does not tell the age of Isaac at the time of binding, some Talmudic sages take it to be thirty seven, likely based on the next biblical story, which is of Sarah's death at 127 years, being 90 when Isaac was born, attributing this to her hearing the news of his intended sacrifice. The sacrifice of Isaac is cited in appeals for the mercy of God in later Jewish traditions. The post-biblical Jewish interpretations often elaborate the role of Isaac beyond the biblical description and primarily focus on Abraham's intended sacrifice of Isaac, called the aqedah ("binding"). According to a version of these interpretations, Isaac died in the sacrifice and was revived. According to many accounts of Aggadah, unlike the Bible, it is Satan who is testing Isaac as an agent of God. Isaac's willingness to follow God's command at the cost of his death has been a model for many Jews who preferred martyrdom to violation of the Jewish law.

According to the Jewish tradition, Isaac instituted the afternoon prayer. This tradition is based on Genesis chapter 24, verse 63 ("Isaac went out to meditate in the field at the eventide").

Isaac was the only patriarch who stayed in Canaan during his whole life and though once he tried to leave, God told him not to do so. Rabbinic tradition gave the explanation that Isaac was almost sacrificed and anything dedicated as a sacrifice may not leave the Land of Israel. Isaac was the oldest of the biblical patriarchs at the time of his death, and the only patriarch whose name was not changed.

Rabbinic literature also linked Isaac's blindness in old age, as stated in the Bible, to the sacrificial binding: Isaac's eyes went blind because the tears of angels present at the time of his sacrifice fell on Isaac's eyes.

== Christian views ==
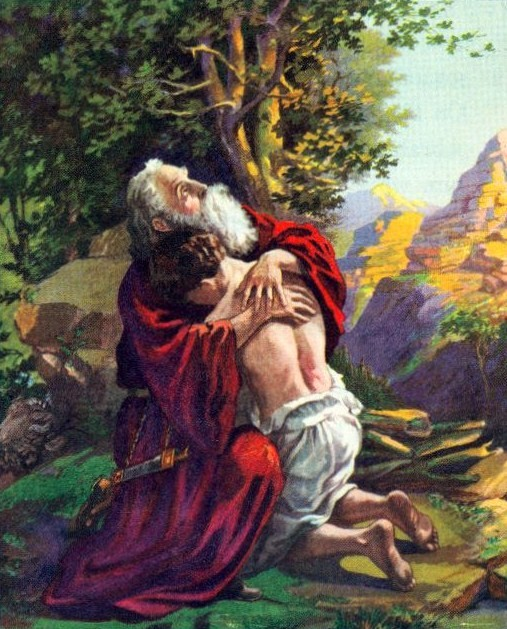
An early 1900s Bible illustration depicts Isaac embracing his father Abraham after the Binding of Isaac

The early Christian church continued and developed the New Testament theme of Isaac as a type of Christ and the Church being both "the son of the promise" and the "father of the faithful". Tertullian draws a parallel between Isaac's bearing the wood for the sacrificial fire with Christ's carrying his cross. and there was a general agreement that, while all the sacrifices of the Old Law were anticipations of that on Calvary, the sacrifice of Isaac was so "in a pre-eminent way".

The New Testament states that Isaac was "offered up" by his father Abraham, and that Isaac blessed his sons. Paul contrasted Isaac, symbolizing Christian liberty, with the rejected older son Ishmael, symbolizing slavery; Hagar is associated with the Sinai covenant, while Sarah is associated with the covenant of grace, into which her son Isaac enters. The Epistle of James chapter 2, verses 21–24, states that the sacrifice of Isaac shows that justification (in the Johannine sense) requires both faith and works.

In the Epistle to the Hebrews, Abraham's willingness to follow God's command to sacrifice Isaac is used as an example of faith as is Isaac's action in blessing Jacob and Esau with reference to the future promised by God to Abraham. In verse 19, the author views the release of Isaac from sacrifice as analogous to the resurrection of Jesus, the idea of the sacrifice of Isaac being a prefigurement of the sacrifice of Jesus on the cross.

The Presbyterian minister James Oswald Dykes portrays Isaac as deeply affected by his mother's death: after her death, "as the months grew into years, his grief for her loss seems to have grown more settled", leaving Abraham obliged to restore his energies by finding a wife for him.

The Eastern Orthodox Church and the Roman Catholic Church consider Isaac as a saint along with other biblical patriarchs. Along with those of other patriarchs and the Old Testament Righteous, his feast day is celebrated in the Eastern Orthodox Church and the Byzantine rite of the Catholic Church on the Second Sunday before Christmas (December 11–17), under the title the Sunday of the Forefathers.

Isaac is commemorated in the Catholic Church on 25 March or on 17 December.

== Islamic views ==
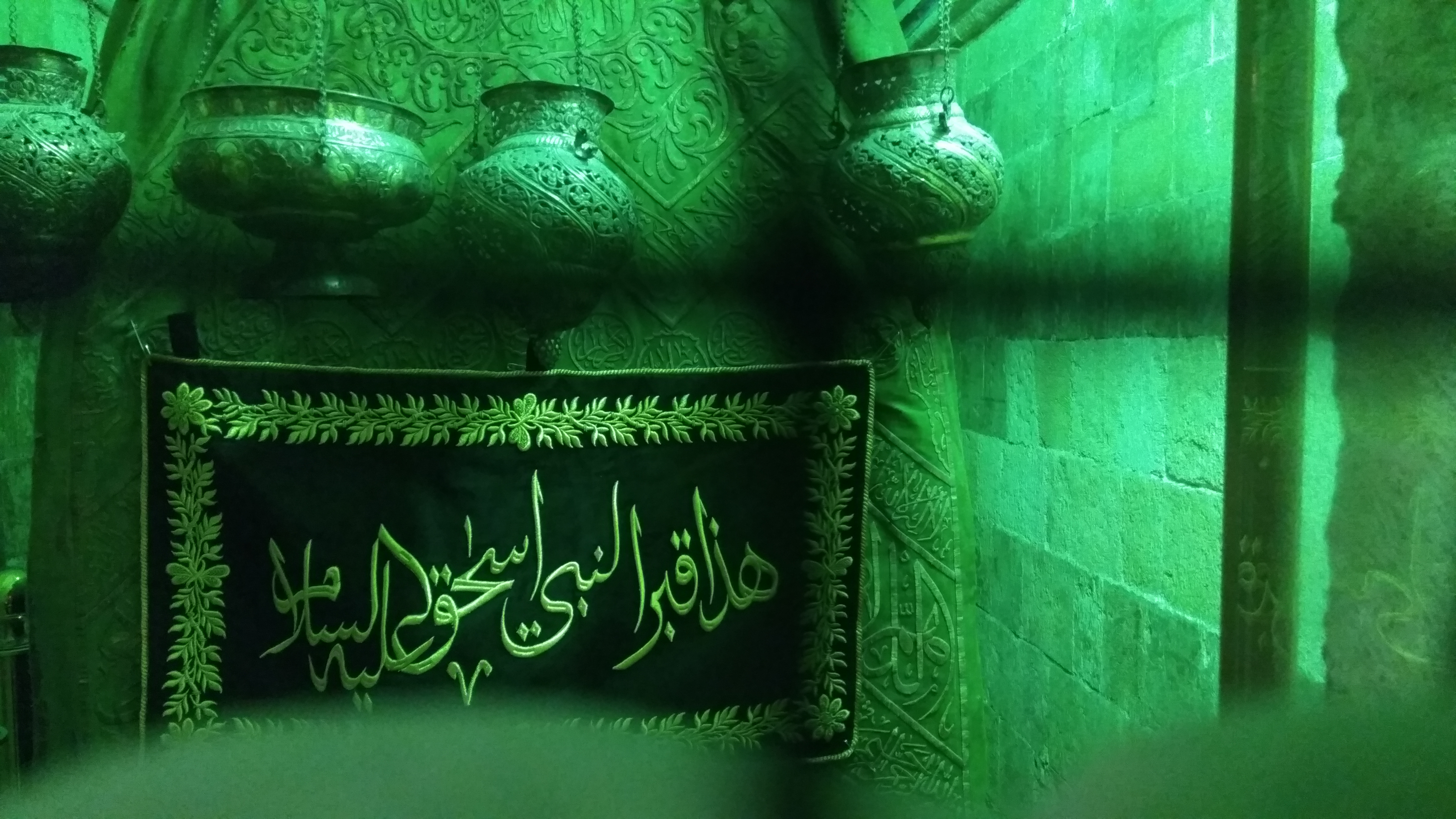
Ishaq name on his grave

Islam considers Isaac (Arabic: إسحاق, romanized: Isḥāq) a prophet, and describes him as the father of the Israelites and a righteous servant of God.

Isaac, along with Ishmael, is highly important for Muslims for continuing to preach the message of monotheism after his father Abraham. Among Isaac's children was the follow-up Israelite patriarch Jacob, who is also venerated as an Islamic prophet.

Isaac is mentioned seventeen times by name in the Quran, often with his father and his son, Jacob. The Quran states that Abraham received "good tidings of Isaac, a prophet, of the righteous", and that God blessed them both (37:112). In a fuller description, when angels came to Abraham to tell him of the future punishment to be imposed on Sodom and Gomorrah, his wife, Sarah, "laughed, and We gave her good tidings of Isaac, and after Isaac of (a grandson) Jacob" (11:71–74); and it is further explained that this event will take place despite Abraham and Sarah's old age. Several verses speak of Isaac as a "gift" to Abraham (6:84; 14:49–50), and 24:26–27 adds that God made "prophethood and the Book to be among his offspring", which has been interpreted to refer to Abraham's two prophetic sons, his prophetic grandson Jacob, and his prophetic great-grandson Joseph. In the Quran, it later narrates that Abraham also praised God for giving him Ishmael and Isaac in his old age (14:39–41).

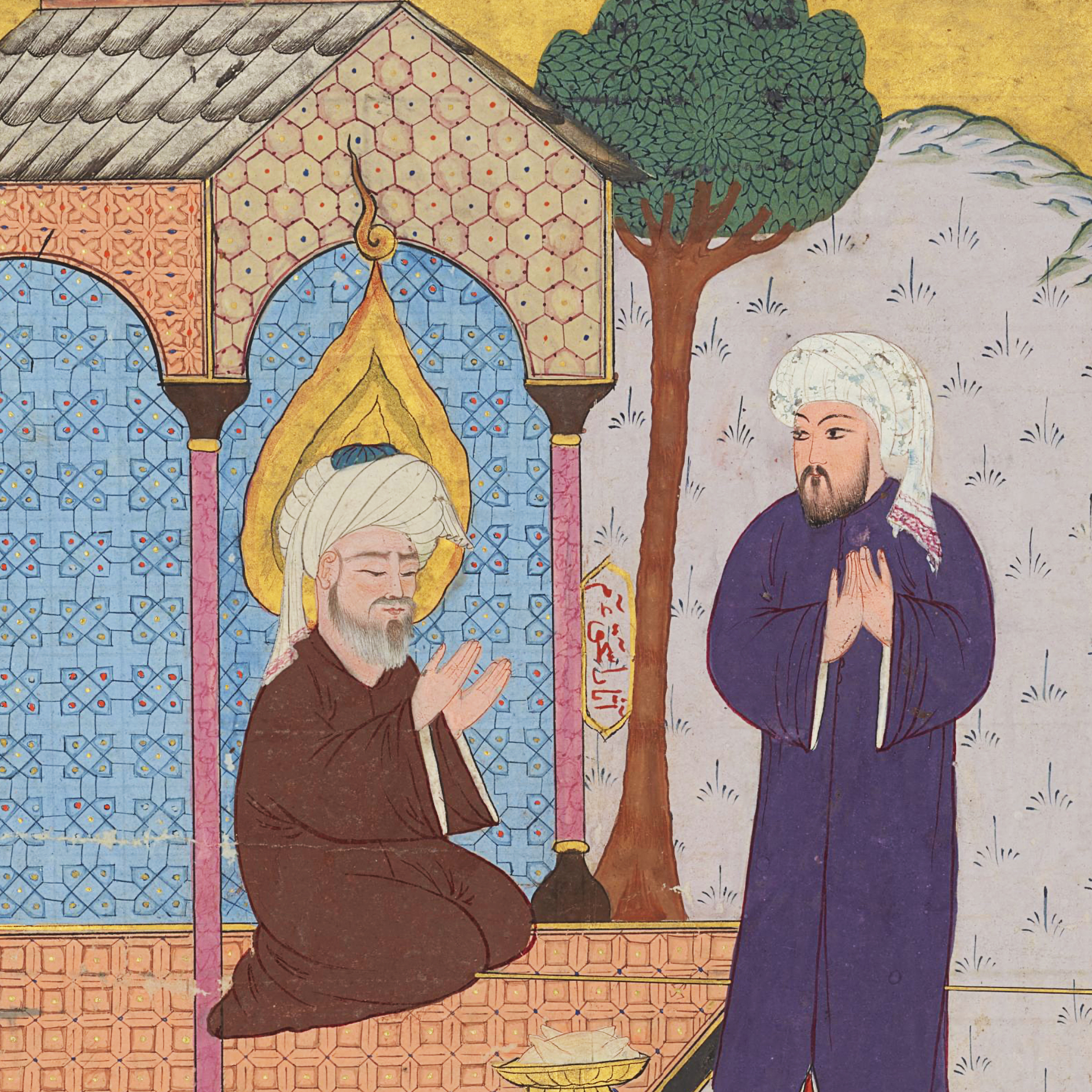
Ottoman depiction of Ishaq praying.

Elsewhere in the Quran, Isaac is mentioned in lists: Joseph follows the religion of his forefathers Abraham, Isaac and Jacob (12:38) and speaks of God's favor to them (12:6); Jacob's sons all testify their faith and promise to worship the God that their forefathers, "Abraham, Ishmael and Isaac", worshiped (2:127); and the Quran commands Muslims to believe in the revelations that were given to "Abraham, Ishmael, Isaac, Jacob and the Patriarchs" (2:136; 3:84). In the Quran's narrative of Abraham's near-sacrifice of his son (37:102), the name of the son is not mentioned and debate has continued over the son's identity, though many feel that the identity is the least important element in a story which is given to show the courage that one develops through faith.

=== Quran ===
The Quran mentions Isaac as a prophet and a righteous man of God. Isaac and Jacob are mentioned as being bestowed upon Abraham as gifts of God, who then worshipped God only and were righteous leaders in the way of God:

And We bestowed on him Isaac and, as an additional gift, (a grandson), Jacob, and We made righteous men of every one (of them). And We made them leaders, guiding (men) by Our Command, and We sent them inspiration to do good deeds, to establish regular prayers, and to practise regular charity; and they constantly served Us (and Us only).

— Surah Al-Anbiya 21:72–73

And WE gave him the glad tidings of Isaac, a Prophet, and one of the righteous.

— Surah As-Saaffat 37:112

== Academic views ==
Some scholars have described Isaac as "a legendary figure" or "as a figure representing tribal history," or "as a seminomadic leader".

The biblical historian A. Jopsen believes in the connection between the Isaac traditions and the north, and in support of this theory adduces Amos 7:9 ("the high places of Isaac").

Israel Finkelstein and Thomas Römer have proposed that Isaac might be the ancestor worshipped in Beersheba and the oldest tradition about him might be an ancestor myth dating back to at least 8th century BCE as shown in Amos 7:9, while proposing that the story about him conflicting with Abimelech, king of Gerar, and Philistines, which is the story that has possibility that Abraham cycle could have vampirized or vice versa, could have been originated and have background in 7th century BCE, and could be made to aim at justifying and legitimizing the claim of Judah over the Judahite territories that are transferred to the Philistine cities by Sennacherib because of several reasons: it was time when Gerar (Tel Haror) had the special importance and fortified Assyrian administration center; there was king of Ashdod, Ahimilki, whose name is similar to that of Abimelech; the Kingdom of Judah could have gotten back parts of Judahite territories while Judah was a compliant vassal of Assyria under Manasseh. In addition, Finkelstein and Römer proposed that Abraham might be the ancestor worshipped in Hebron, and Jacob might be the ancestor worshipped in Israel, but the earliest tradition of Jacob, the tradition about him and his uncle Laban the Aramean establishing the border between them, might have originated in Gilead.

== In art ==
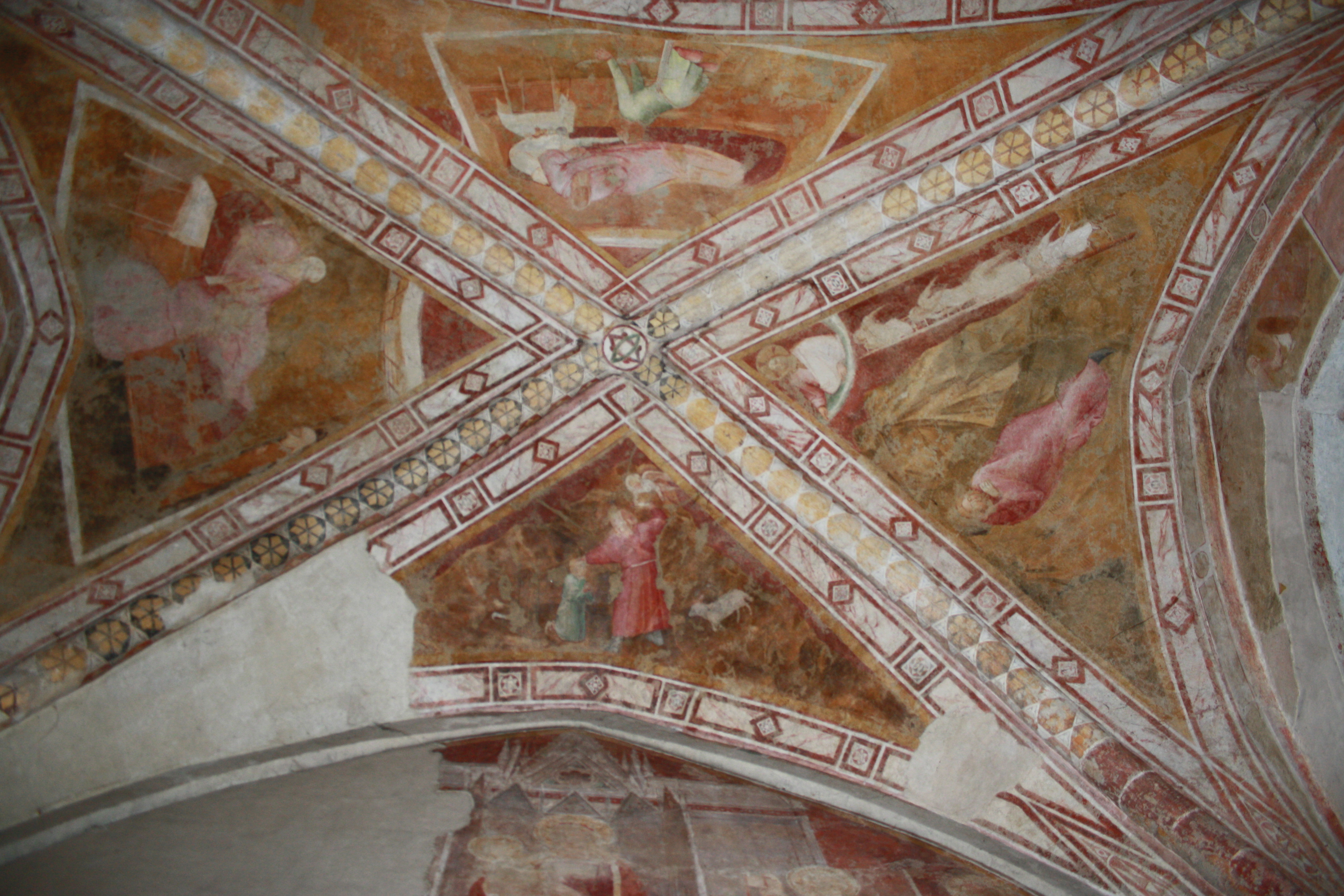
Stories of Jacob and Isaac by Giusto de' Menabuoi (14th century)

The earliest Christian portrayal of Isaac is found in the Roman catacomb frescoes. Excluding the fragments, Alison Moore Smith classifies these artistic works in three categories:

Abraham leads Isaac towards the altar; or Isaac approaches with the bundle of sticks, Abraham having preceded him to the place of offering ... Abraham is upon a pedestal and Isaac stands near at hand, both figures in orant attitude ... Abraham is shown about to sacrifice Isaac while the latter stands or kneels on the ground beside the altar. Sometimes Abraham grasps Isaac by the hair. Occasionally the ram is added to the scene and in the later paintings the Hand of God emerges from above.

== See also ==
- Biblical and Quranic narratives
- Testament of Isaac
- The Binding of Isaac
- Wife–sister narratives in the Book of Genesis – three such narratives, involving Abraham (two) and Isaac (one)
