= Shuah =

Name of one of four minor Biblical figures

Shuah is the name of one of four minor Biblical figures. It is sometimes used as the name of a fifth. Their names are different in Hebrew, but they were all transliterated as "Shuah" in the King James Version of the Bible.

== Genesis 25 ==
Shuah (Hebrew: שׁוּחַ, romanized: Šūaḥ, "ditch; swimming; humiliation" or "sinks down") was the sixth son of Abraham (the patriarch of the Israelites) and Keturah, whom Abraham had wed after the death of Sarah. He was the youngest of Keturah's sons; the other sons were Zimran, Jokshan, Medan, Midian, and Ishbak.

== Genesis 38 ==
Shuah or Shua (Hebrew: שׁוּעַ, romanized: Šūaʿ, "opulence" or "cry for help") was a certain Canaanite, whose unnamed daughter marries Judah. He was thereby also the grandfather of Er, Onan, and Shelah.

The Targum translates "Canaanite man" as "merchant", and Rashi refers to this. In the Talmud, Pesachim 50a, there is a discussion explaining this translation.

In the King James Version, Genesis 38:2 reads "And Judah saw there a daughter of a certain Canaanite, whose name was Shuah." The Hebrew says "his name", and Genesis 38:12 refers to the death of Shuah's daughter, but some writers have suggested that the wording could be ambiguous as to whether Shuah was the Canaanite father or his daughter.

Shuah in Greek is Σαυα, transliterated Sava. The Septuagint is explicit that Sava was the daughter of the Canaanite man and the wife of Judah.

The reference to Judah's wife in Genesis 38:12 refers to her as the "daughter of Shuah", or "bat-Shuah" in Hebrew. This has led some to take Bat-Shuah (and variants) as her actual name. A midrashic tradition says her name was Aliyath. Bat-Shuah is also an alternative name for Bathsheba, wife of Judah's descendant, King David.

== 1 Chronicles 4 ==
Shuah or Shuhah (Hebrew: שׁוּחָה, romanized: Šūḥā) is a descendant of Judah. No gender or father is named, just a brother Chelub and his descendants. Ralbag in his commentary says that Shuhah is the same as Hushah (חוּשָׁה) listed earlier in the genealogy. Nave says Shuhah is "probably the same" as Hushah.

Shuah in Greek is ᾿Ασχὰ, transliterated Ascha. The Septuagint states that Chaleb was Ascha's father.

== 1 Chronicles 7 ==
Shuah or Shua (Hebrew: שׁוּעָא, romanized: Šūʿā, "wealth") was a great-granddaughter of Asher. She was the daughter of Heber, who was a son of Beriah, a son of Asher. Her brothers were Japhlet, Shomer, and Hotham.

Shuah in Greek is Σωλὰ, transliterated Sola.
