= Eupolemus =

Hellenistic Jewish historian

Eupolemus (Greek: Ἐυπόλεμος) is the earliest Hellenistic Jewish historian whose writing survives from Antiquity. Five (or possibly six) fragments of his work have been preserved in Eusebius of Caesarea's Praeparatio Evangelica (hereafter abbreviated as Praep.), embedded in quotations from the historian Alexander Polyhistor, and in the Stromata (hereafter abbreviated as Strom.) of Clement of Alexandria.

A sixth passage which Polyhistor attributes to Eupolemus in Eusebius' quotations of Polyhistor is usually considered spurious as being dissimilar to the other passages quoted and has come to be called Pseudo-Eupolemus.

Style and vocabulary indicate the writing as also originally in Greek and the date of composition of the seemingly genuine passages is about 158/7 BC. That the author dates his work by the Seleucids rather than the Ptolemies suggests Palestinian rather than Egyptian origin. It has been speculated that the author might be the Eupolemus who was ambassador of Judas Maccabeus to Rome as found in 1 Maccabees 8.17f and 2 Maccabees 4.11.

== Writings ==
The fragments usually considered Eupolemus' genuine work are:

- A statement that Moses was the first wise man, that he taught the alphabet to the Jews who passed it on to the Phoenicians who passed it on to the Greeks, and that Moses first wrote laws for the Jews (Praep. 9.26.1).
- Some chronology about the period from Moses to David and some details of David's arrangements for building the temple followed by purported transcripts of letters exchanged between King Solomon and "Vaphres King of Egypt" and between Solomon and "Souron the King of Tyre", the Biblical Hiram (Praep. 9.30.1–34.18).
- A short statement about gold shields made by Solomon (Praep. 9.34.20).
- A very short account of the persecution of the prophet Jeremiah by King "Jonachim" who seems to correspond to the Biblical kings Jehoiakim, Jehoiachin, and Zedekiah followed by a short fictionalized account of the fall of Judah ending with the note that Jeremiah preserved the ark and the tablets (Praep. 9.39.2–5).
- A chronological summary indicating 5,149 years from Adam to the 5th year of Demetrius (Strom. 1.141,4).

== Writing of Pseudo-Eupolemus ==
The fragment usually known as Pseudo-Eupolemus (Praep. 9.17.2–9) relates:

- The Assyrian city of Babylon [sic] was built by giants who escaped the Flood and they also built the tower. After its destruction the giants were scattered.
- There follows a summary of Abraham's career based on the Biblical account with some changes and details similar to those found in the Genesis Apocryphon and Josephus and in Enochite tradition. Abraham is particularly knowledgeable about astronomy and when he goes down to Egypt he teaches astrology to the Egyptian priests and explains that Enoch first discovered astrology.
- Then follows a puzzling passage which seems to have little to do with the context and may be garbled:

For the Babylonians say that the first was Belus, who is the same as Cronus, and that of him were born sons named Belus and Canaan. This Canaan fathered the father of the Phoenicians, whose son was Chum/Chus, called by the Greeks Asbolus and was the father of the Ethiopians and the brother of Mestraim, the ancestor of the Egyptians.

Traditionally many translators have emended Canaan to Cham, that is Ham since in Genesis 10.6 Ham is the father of Cush and Mizraim. However the author here claims to be relating Babylonian tradition, not Hebrew tradition, for whatever that is worth. Asbolus means 'sooty'.

Robert Doran in his translation in The Old Testament Pseudepigrapha, Volume 2, emends einai Kronon 'is the same as Cronus' to einai Kronou 'is son of Cronus' noting that in no other text is anyone called Belus ever equated with Cronus. However, in Sanchuniathon's Historie, we find the gods Cronus & Elus in the same place on the genealogical tree, even though Elus is equated to El in this case.

- The account concludes by indicating that the Greeks relate that Atlas discovered astrology but that Atlas is really Enoch and that Enoch learned from the angels of God.

Robert Doran gives reason for believing that this fragment may be part of the genuine work of Eupolemus despite earlier doubts.

== Selected bibliography ==
- "Eupolemus", translated by F. Fallon (pp. 861–872), and "Pseudo-Eupolemus", translated by R. Doran (pp. 873–879) in The Old Testament Pseudepigrapha, Volume 2, edited by James H. Charlesworth, Doubleday; New York, 1985. ISBN 0-385-18813-7.
- Eusebius
  - Eusebius, Werke: Band 8: De Praeparatio Evangelica, ed. K. Mras. (Die griechischen christlichen Schriftsteller der ersten drei Jahrhunderte), 43,1–2 Berlin, 1954–56. (This is the standard critical edition of Eusebius.)
  - Eusebius, Preparation for the Gospel: Part 1, Books 1–9, translated by Edward Hamilton Gifford, Clarendon Press; Oxford, 1903. Reissued by Baker House Company, 1991. ISBN 0-8010-3369-1 (ppr), ISBN 0-8010-3370-5 (clth). This is available on the web and the Eupolemus material begins in Tertullian Project: Praeparatio: Book 9.
- Clement of Alexandria
  - Clemens Alexandrinus, Werke, eds. Stählin. O. and Fruechtel. L. (Die griechischen christlichen Schriftsteller der ersten drei Jahrhunderte, 15), Berlin, 1960. This is the standard critical edition of Clement of Alexandria.
  - Clement of Alexandria, "Stromata" in Ante-Nicene Fathers: Fathers of the Second Century, Vol. 2, edited by Alexander Roberts, reissued by Wm. B. Eerdmans Publishing Co., 1988. ISBN 0-8028-8088-6. This is available on the web and the Eupolemus fragment begins in Christian Classics Ethereal Library: Anti-Nicene Fathers, Vol. 2: Clement of Alexandria: Stromata: Book I: Chapter XXI.
