= Artapanus of Alexandria =

Alexandrian Jewish historian

Fragment of "Artapanus of Alexandria", scan from 1928 Altjüdisches Schrifttum außerhalb der Bibel by Paul Rießler

Artapanus of Alexandria (Gk. Ἀρτάπανος ὁ Ἀλεξανδρεύς) was a historian, of Alexandrian Jewish origin, who is believed to have lived in Alexandria, during the later half of the 3rd or 2nd century BCE. Although most scholars assume Artapanus lived in Alexandria, others argue he resided in the countryside. Regardless, Artapanus lived in Egypt.

Artapanus wrote Concerning The Jews, a history of the Jews, in Greek between 250 and 100 BCE, but this text has not survived to the present. Artapanus's writings may be interpreted as a response to those such as Manetho writing as early as the 3rd century BCE; therefore, Artapanus most likely wrote no earlier than the middle of the 3rd century. It is arguable that Artapanus wrote in the second half of the 3rd century BCE under the influence of Ptolemy IV Philopator's reign between 221 and 204 BCE; however, Alexander Polyhistor's citation of Artapanus in the middle of the 1st century BCE makes it likely that Artapanus wrote no later than the end of the 2nd century BCE. Polyhistor's writings have not survived to the present.

Parts of Artapanus's work have been preserved in the books of two later historians: Clement of Alexandria in Stromata (Book I, chapter 23.154,2f) and Eusebius of Caesarea in Præparatio Evangelica (Book IX, chapters 18, 23, and 27). According to J. J. Collins and James H. Charlesworth, "we do not have actual excerpts from Artapanus but only the summaries of Alexander Polyhistor, insofar as these have been preserved by Eusebius."

== Works and portrayal of Moses ==
There is general scholarly consensus that Artapanus used the Septuagint as a framework for his historical narrative, liberally manipulating its stories to create his own unique account. He describes the Egyptian adventures of the three major Jewish patriarchs, Abraham, Joseph, and Moses, depicting them as heroes responsible for many of the cultural innovations of the ancient Near East.

According to Artapanus, Abraham taught an Egyptian pharaoh the science of astrology, while Moses bestowed many "useful benefits on mankind" by inventing boats, Egyptian weapons, and philosophy. (Eusebius, PrEv 9.27.4) He also recounts that the Greeks called Moses Musaeus and that he taught Orpheus, who was widely considered to be the father of Greek culture. Similarly, Artapanus credits Moses with the division of Egypt into 36 nomes as well as the successful conquest of Ethiopia, two accomplishments traditionally attributed to the Egyptian folk hero Sesostris. Throughout the narrative Artapanus insists that the public loved these Jewish figures for their impressive innovations and achievements. In fact, he remarks that the Ethiopians went so far as to circumcise themselves out of admiration for Moses.

One of the most striking aspects of Artapanus' works is the ease with which he syncretizes Jewish and Egyptian culture and religion. Artapanus also writes that Moses is responsible for appointing "for each of the [36] nomes the god to be worshipped, and that they should be cats and dogs and ibises." There is no doubt that Artapanus was familiar with the animal cults of Egypt and many cult centers for the worship of cats, such as Tell el-Bubastis, and ibises, such as Tuna el-Gebel (outside of Hermopolis), were flourishing in the time Artapanus was writing. Unfortunately, the mention of "cats and dogs and ibises" does not give us enough knowledge about the various cult centers that might be used for dating the work. However, we cannot know from only Artapanus' account the extent to which this religious syncretism existed in the minds of other Jews or Egyptians writing or living at this time. Although Artapanus credits Moses with the foundation of the animal cults, he also claims that the "consecrated animals" were destroyed during the crossing of the Red Sea.

Moses is also identified with Hermes in 9.27.6 (Eusebius, PrEv): "On account of these things Moses was loved by the masses, and was deemed worthy of godlike honor by the priests and called Hermes, on account of the interpretation of sacred letters." Hermes was a Greek messenger god who was in Egyptian traditions associated with Thoth (Djehuty), the god of wisdom and time who invented writing. John J. Collins points out the Greek linguistic play that must have existed in Artapanus' day of Moses, Thoth, and the common name Thutmosis; yet this is not why Artapanus associates Moses with Thoth. Instead, Artapanus makes the connection between the Jewish patriarchs who taught the Egyptians skills such as astrology (Abraham, Eusebius PrEv 9.18.1) and Moses who, by interpreting the sacred letters (presumably Hebrew Script), attained the godlike knowledge of Thoth. Moses' connection to the obscure Jewish figure Enoch has also been made by some scholars, as Enoch was said to have taught human beings the "right" kind of astrology (for instance, the solar calendar; 1 Enoch 1–36), however Artapanus only clearly denotes Moses' association with Hermes/Thoth.

== Theology and motivation ==
Artapanus' theology is an issue of extreme contention among the scholarly community. Some scholars take him to be a polytheistic Jew. John Barclay, for example, sees Artapanus' acceptance of the Egyptian animal cults and his depiction of Moses as divine as signs of his polytheism. Others observe that his fascination with the miraculous powers of Moses are reminiscent of Hellenistic paganism. A different group of scholars, however, believes that Artapanus practiced monolatry – he himself worshipped only one god but acknowledged the possible existence of others. They argue that Artapanus maintains the superiority of YHVH throughout his text, and that his depiction of Moses as divine actually has biblical origins.

Artapanus' motivation for writing his history is equally debated. One branch of analysis emphasizes the underlying tension between the diaspora Jews and their Hellenistic neighbors. For example, some scholars, such as Carl Holladay, see Artapanus' writings as "competitive historiography." These scholars argue that Artapanus aimed to defend the Jews from the attacks of gentile historians such as Manetho, and this explains his superior depiction of the Jewish patriarchs. James Charlesworth of Princeton University, for example, argues Artapanus composed a "pro-Jewish apology" in response to anti-Moses and other anti-Jewish Egyptian stereotypes. Others refute the former argument, claiming it is highly unlikely that any gentiles would read an embellished history of the Jews that disparaged their own cultures' accomplishments. Instead, these scholars insist that Artapanus' target audience was primarily the Jews themselves, and he wrote this romantic history to bolster their national pride. Some scholars accept both of these arguments, claiming that Artapanus' narrative at once represents an apologetic historiography and a romantic piece of national propaganda.

On the other hand, Erich Gruen insists that these arguments completely miss Artapanus' humor and thus his major motivation. He argues that Artapanus did not intend for his readers to take his imaginative tale literally, since anyone familiar with the biblical stories would quickly recognize his fantastical additions and manipulations. Instead, Gruen insists that Artanpanus playfully teases the pharaohs and exaggerates the accomplishments of the Jewish patriarchs to "comic proportions" in order to demonstrate his own self-confidence as a diaspora Jew. It is this sense of comfort that he aimed to give his Jewish readers.

== Literary impact ==
Although it is possible that Artapanus influenced the Jewish historian Josephus, it seems that he generally had little impact on later Jewish literature.

== Bibliography ==
- H. M. Zellentin, "The End of Jewish Egypt: Artapanus and the Second Exodus," in Gregg Gardner and Kevin L Osterloh (eds), Antiquity in Antiquity: Jewish and Christian Pasts in the Greco-Roman World (Tuebingen, Mohr Siebeck, 2008) (Texte und Studien zum antiken Judentum, 123), 27–73.
