= Paedagogus (occupation) =

Slave tasked with teaching boys

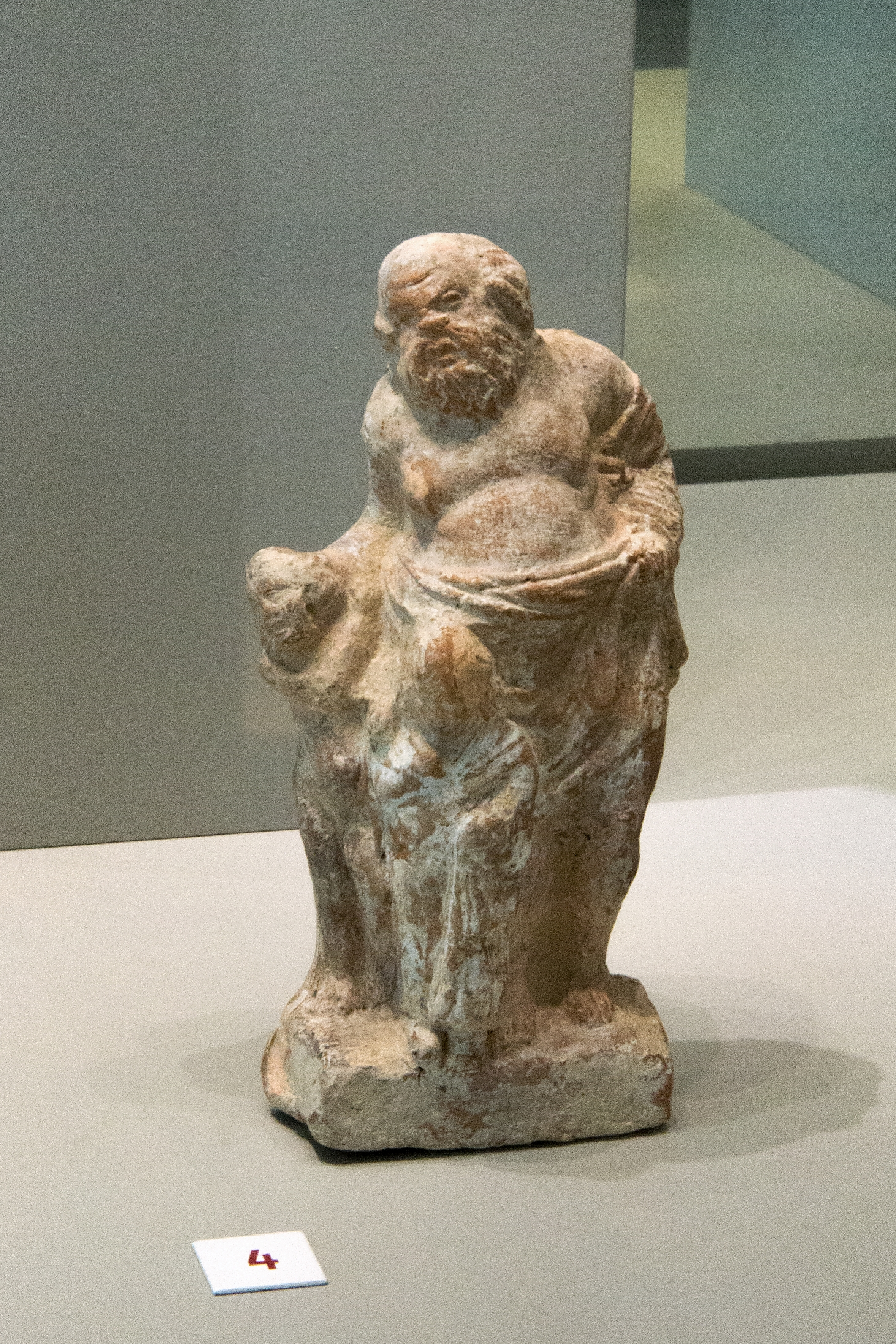
Paedagogus with two boys. Small terracotta from Tanagra, Greece, 4th century BC.

In ancient Greece, a paidagogos (Ancient Greek: παιδαγωγός) was a slave entrusted with supervising boys from the age of seven and in the Roman Republic, the paedagogus, plural paedagogi or paedagogiani, was a slave or a freedman who taught the sons of Roman citizens the Greek language. In the period of the Roman Empire, the paedagogus became the director of the paedagogium.

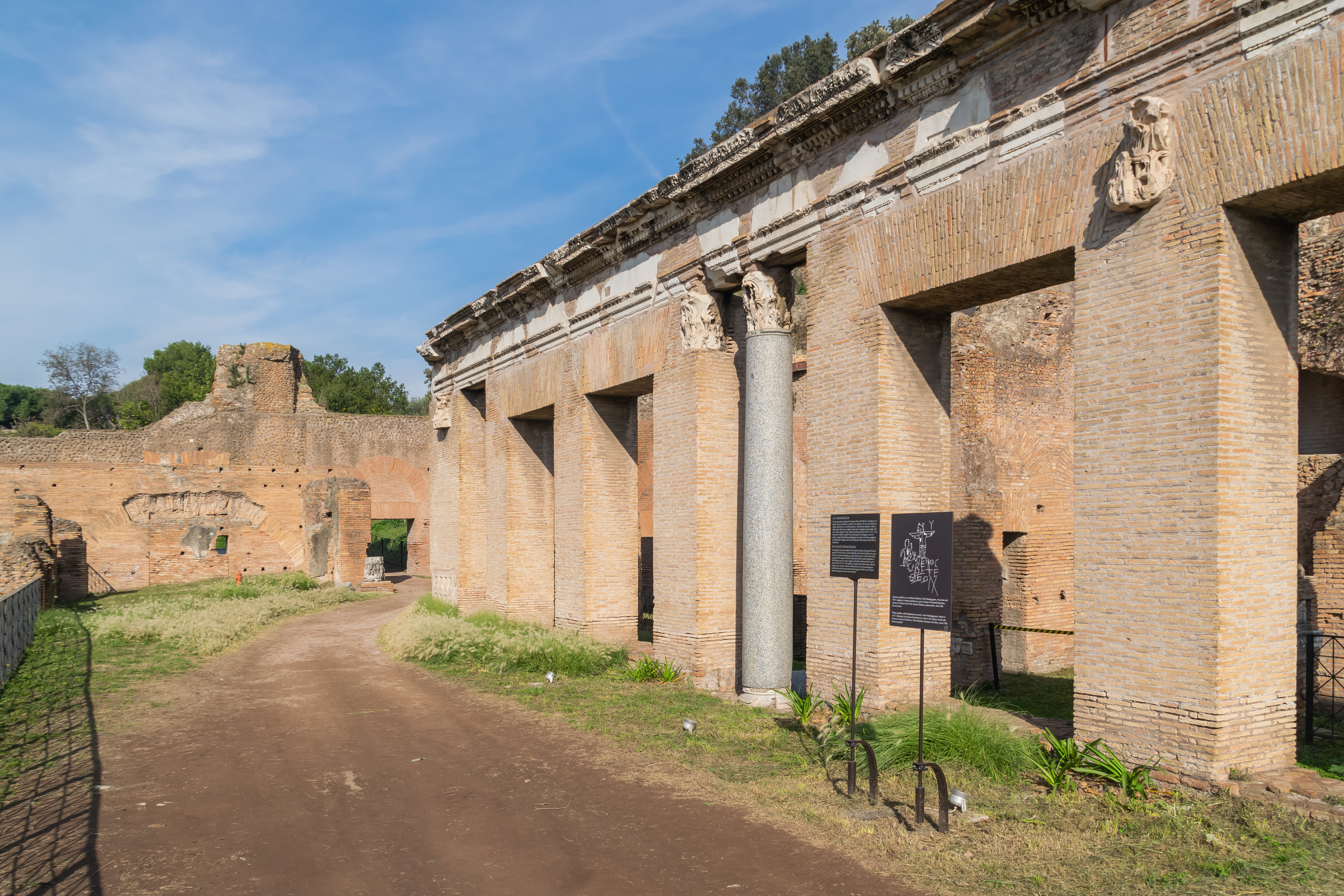
The Palatine paedagogium

There were no public schools in the early Roman Republic so boys were taught to read and write by their parents or by educated paedagogi, usually of Greek origin.

A representation of a paedagogus was painted as a graffito on the walls of the paedagogium of the Palatine, and it represents his social and cultural formation, which is identified such a slave.

An inscription of the second century dedicated to the Roman emperor Caracalla lists twenty-four paedagogi. In some cases, the title of paedagogus is connected with private elite families.

Being a paedagogus meant obeying conduct and duty laws.

In the imperial institution, the title of paedagogus refers to the duty of child-attendant or tutor rather than a teacher. The other title of paedagogus refers to a variety of interrelated capacities related to the offspring of the imperial family and aristocracy: disciplina (academic and moral instruction), custodia (companion and protector) and decorum (directives of precepts for public behaviour). There is a third title which appears in three inscriptions and means the director of the paedagogium (praeceptor).

== Bibliography ==
- Bradley, Keith R. (1991). Discovering the Roman Family: Studies in Roman Social History. New York: Oxford University Press. ISBN 0-19-505857-7.
- Keegan, Peter (2013). "Reading the Pages of the Domus Caesaris: Pueri Delicati, Slave Education, and the Graffiti of the Palatine Paedagogium". In George, Michele (ed.). Roman Slavery and Roman Material Culture. University of Toronto Press. ISBN 978-1-4426-4457-1.
