= Alexander Polyhistor =

1st-century BC Greek scholar

Lucius Cornelius Alexander Polyhistor (Ancient Greek: Ἀλέξανδρος ὁ Πολυΐστωρ; flourished in the first half of the 1st century BC; also called Alexander of Miletus) was a Greek scholar who was enslaved by the Romans during the Mithridatic War and taken to Rome as a tutor. After his release, he continued to live in Italy as a Roman citizen. He was so productive as a writer that he earned the surname Polyhistor (very learned). The majority of his writings are now lost, but the fragments that remain shed valuable light on antiquarian and eastern Mediterranean subjects. Among his works were historical and geographical accounts of nearly all the countries of the ancient world, and the book Upon the Jews (Ancient Greek: Περὶ Ἰουδαίων) which excerpted many works which might otherwise be unknown.

== Life ==
The Suda is the main source of information about Alexander's life. He was born in Miletus, Asia Minor, between 110 and 105 BC and educated by Crates of Mallus in Pergamon, before being captured in the Mithridatic War and brought to Rome as a slave. He was owned by a Cornelius Lentulus, and became his tutor. Alexander was subsequently freed, and given Roman citizenship by Sulla in 81 BC. He taught Hyginus, and according to the Suda wrote books "beyond number". Sometime after 40 BC he died in a fire at Laurentum.

== Works ==
The 10th-century Suda makes no attempt to list his works, asserting that he composed books "beyond number."

Alexander's most important treatise consisted of forty-two books of historical and geographical accounts of nearly all the countries of the ancient world. These included five books On Rome, the Aigyptiaca (at least three books), On Bithynia, On the Euxine Sea, On Illyria, Indica and a Chaldæan History. Another notable work is about the Jews: this reproduces in paraphrase relevant excerpts from Jewish writers, of whom nothing otherwise would be known (see below). As a philosopher, Alexander wrote Successions of Philosophers, mentioned several times by Diogenes Laërtius in his Lives and Opinions of Eminent Philosophers. None of Alexander's works survive as such: only quotations and paraphrases are to be found, largely in the works of Diogenes Laertius. Eusebius extracted a large portion in his Chaldean Chronicle.

One of Alexander's students was Gaius Julius Hyginus, Latin author, scholar and friend of Ovid, who was appointed by Augustus to be superintendent of the Palatine library. From what Laërtius describes or paraphrases in his work, Alexander recorded various thoughts on contradictions, fate, life, soul and its parts, perfect figures, and different curiosities, such as advice not to eat beans.

=== Upon the Jews ===
Louis Ginzberg wrote of Alexander's work: "Although these excerpts reveal their author as nothing but a compiler without taste or judgment, and bereft of all literary ability, they possess, even in their meagerness, a certain value." In his compilation Jewish and non-Jewish sources are cited indiscriminately side by side; and to Alexander, therefore, the world is indebted for information on the oldest Jewish, Hellenic, and Samaritan elaboration of Biblical history in prose or poetry. The epic poet Philo, the tragic writer Ezekiel, the historian Eupolemus, the chronicler Demetrius, the so-called Artapanus, the historian Aristeas, and Theodotus the Samaritan, as well as an unnamed fellow countryman of the latter often confused with Eupolemus, the rhetorician Apollonius Molon (an anti-Jewish writer)—all of these authors are known to posterity only through extracts from their works which Alexander embodied verbatim in his. Of some interest for the ancient history of the Jews is his account of Assyria-Babylonia, frequently drawn upon by Jewish and Christian authors; in it extracts are given, especially from Berossus, and also from the Chronicles of Apollodoros and the Third Book of the Sibyllines. Josephus made use of the work, and likewise Eusebius in his Chronicles. Probably only Alexander's account of the Flood is taken from Berossus, who is confirmed by the newest Assyrian discoveries, while his account of the Confusion of Tongues is probably of Jewish-Hellenic origin. Another work of his seems to have contained considerable information concerning the Jews. What Eusebius quotes would seem to have been taken from this work, which is no longer extant, except indirectly through Josephus. It may be noted that Alexander twice mentions the Bible, which, however, he knew only superficially, as appears from his curious statement that the Law of the Jews was given to them by a woman named Moso, and that Judea received its name from Judah and Idumea, children of Semiramis.

The text of the fragments preserved is in very unsatisfactory shape, owing to insufficient collation of the manuscripts. How much of his originals Alexander himself omitted is difficult to say, in view of the corrupt state of the text of Eusebius, where most of his fragments are to be found. Abydenus—the Christian editor of Alexander's works—evidently had a different text before him from that which Eusebius possessed.

Text of the fragments Περὶ Ἰουδαίων is to be found in Eusebius, Praeparatio Evangelica, ix. 17; Clemens Alexandrinus, Stromata i. 21, 130, and Müller, Fragmenta Historicorum Graecorum, iii. 211–230; prose extracts, from a new collation of the manuscripts, in Freudenthal, "Alexander Polyhistor," pp. 219–236.

=== Succession of the Philosophers ===
Seven fragments of the Successions are preserved within Diogenes Laertius:

1. Pherecydes was a Syrian, the son of Babys, and a pupil of Pittacus.
2. Socrates was a pupil of Damon.
3. Euclides of Megara was a native of Gela.
4. Plato learnt gymnastic exercises under the wrestler Ariston of Argos, who gave him the name Plato on account of his robust figure. Plato had previously been called Aristocles, after the name of his grandfather... Plato philosophized at first in the Academy, and afterwards in the garden near Colonus.
5. Carneades was the son or Philocomus and a native of Cyrene.
6. Chrysippus was the son of Apollonius, and a native of either Soli or Tarsus. He was a pupil of Cleanthes.
7. Numerous dogmas of Pythagorean numerology (extant in Diogenes Laertius, Life of Pythagoras).
