= Thallus (historian) =

Greek historian

Thallus (Greek: Θαλλός, Thallos), perhaps a Samaritan, was an early historian who wrote in Koine Greek. He wrote a three-volume history of the Mediterranean world from before the Trojan War to the 167th Olympiad, 112–108 BC, or perhaps to the 217th Olympiad (AD 89-93) or 207th Olympiad (AD 49-52). Most of his work, like the vast majority of ancient literature, has been lost, although some of his writings were quoted by the Christian author Sextus Julius Africanus in his History of the World. It is not known when he lived and wrote, but his work is quoted by Theophilus of Antioch, who died around AD 185, and most scholars date Thallus' writings to around 50 AD.

Some Christians claim that Thallus' writing confirms the historicity of Jesus and provides non-Christian validation of the Gospel accounts. According to Sextus Julius Africanus, Thallus apparently refers, in the third book of his histories, to the darkness at the time of the crucifixion of Jesus Christ and explained it away as a solar eclipse; there is a range of interpretations on the matter.

== The fragments of Thallus ==
1. There are fragments from the 3 books of Thallus, in which he made a summary in abbreviated fashion from the sack of Troy to the 167th Olympiad [i.e. 109 BC] (Eusebius, Chronicle, I. K125.2)
2. Castor and Thallus [recorded] Syrian events. (Sextus Julius Africanus, in Eusebius, Praeparatio Evangelica, X.10)
3. The archives of the most ancient races—the Egyptians, Chaldaeans, and Phoenicians—need to be opened, and their citizens must be called upon, through whom knowledge must be provided—a certain Manetho the Egyptian and Berossus the Chaldaean, but also Jerome the Phoenician king of Tyre; and their followers, too: Ptolemy the Mendesian and Menander the Ephesian and Demetrius the Phalerean and king Juba and Apion and Thallus and the one who either proves or refutes these men, Josephus the Jew. (Tertullian, Apologeticum 19)
4. Sextus Julius Africanus writes, concerning the passion of Christ, "Concerning each of his deeds and his cures, both of bodies and souls, and the secrets of his knowledge, and his Resurrection from the dead, this has been explained with complete adequacy by his disciples and the apostles before us. A most terrible darkness fell over all the world, the rocks were torn apart by an earthquake, and many places both in Judaea and the rest of the world were thrown down. In the third book of his Histories, Thallos dismisses this darkness as a solar eclipse. In my opinion, this is nonsense. ..." (Africanus, in George Syncellus, Cronography)
5. For Thallus also remembers Belus the ruler of Assyria and Cronos the Titan, asserting that Belus waged war along with the Titans against Zeus and the select gods who were with him, stating at this point: 'and defeated, Ogygus fled to Tartessus. While at that time that region was famous as Akte, now it is called Attica, which Ogygus then took over.' (Theophilus of Antioch, Ad Autolycum 3.29)
6. For according to the history of Thallus, we find that Belus was born 322 years prior to the Trojan War. (Lactantius, Divine Institutions I.23)
7. And so ... neither Diodorus the Greek nor Thallus, neither Cassius Severus nor Cornelius Nepos, nor any commentator on such ancient matters, prints that Saturn was anything but a man. (Tertullian, Apologeticus 10).
8. Therefore, not only all poets, but even all historians and all writers on ancient matters, who have published for posterity his deeds done in Italy, agree he was a man: in Greek, Diodorus and Thallus, and in Latin, Nepos and Cassius and Varro. (Lactantius, Divine Institutions. I.13).
9. All writers of Greek and Roman antiquities tell us that Saturn, the first of his kind, was a man: Nepos knows this, and Cassius in history, as well as Thallus and Diodorus, say this. (Marcus Minucius Felix, Octavius, 21)
10. Regarding the events before the Olympiads, consider how the Attic chronologers reckon: from the time of Ogygus, during whose tenure the first great flood occurred in Attica, while Phoroneus was ruling the Argives, as Acusilaus records, up to the time of the first year of the first Olympiad, the point after which the Greeks consider time to be reckoned more accurately, 1020 years passed, which agrees with those mentioned earlier and with those who were listed in order. For the writers on Athenian history, Hellanicus and Philochorus (who wrote Atthis) and writers on Syrian affairs, Castor and Thallus, and writers on world affairs, Diodorus (who wrote the Library) and Alexander Polyhistor, and some of our contemporaries record these events even more accurately than all the Attic historians. (Africanus, in Eusebius, Praeparatio Evangelica, X.10)
11. So know this: of all those among us [the Jews] happen to be more ancient than many: [for instance] ... Moses ... as is clear to us in the histories of the Greeks. ... For in the times of Ogygus and Inachus ... they record Moses ... so does Polemon in his first book of history of the Greeks, and Apion ... and Ptolemaeus the Mendesian, who wrote a history of Egypt, all these men agree. And the writers on Athenian history, Hellanicus and Philochorus (who wrote Atthis), Castor and Thallus and Alexander Polyhistor, and also those most wise of men, Philo and Josephus ... [all these men] mention Moses, as they do the very old and ancient origin of the Jews. (Pseudo-Justin, Cohortatio ad Graecos, 9)
12. 41 Assyrian kings ruled the kingdom of the Arabs, who also ruled from the [?] year of the world to the [?] year of the world, enduring all of [?] years from the first of them, Belus, until the 41st king, Macoscolerus, the son of Sardanapallus, as most noted historians agree, including Polybius, Diodorus, Cephalion, Castor, Thallus and others. (Syncellus, Chronography)
13. After the 70th year of the captivity, Cyrus was king of the Persians in the first year of the 55th Olympiad, as we find in the Library of Diodorus and the Histories of Thallus and Castor, and also in the works of Polybius and Phlegon, but also in those of others who concern themselves with Olympiads: they are all in agreement about the date. (Africanus, in Eusebius, Praeparatio Evangelica, X.10)
14. Those most wise men, Thallus, Castor [259 F 11], and Polybius [254 F 4]...and among others, Herodotus...and the wise Theophilus, all recorded the chronology of the reign of Croesus. (John Malalas, Chronografia, VI).

According to Robert E. Van Voorst, Thallus was "the first ancient writer known to us to express literary opposition to Christianity. Moreover, Thallos is also the only non-Christian to write about a Jesus tradition before that tradition was written in the canonical Gospels (see Redactiongeschichte).

== Time and subjects of work ==
Thallus is first mentioned around AD 180 by Theophilus Bishop of Antioch in his Ad Autolycum ('To Autolycus'), which at 3.29 states:

Thallus makes mention of Belus, the King of the Assyrians, and Cronus the Titan; and says that Belus, with the Titans, made war against Zeus and his compeers, who are called gods. He says, moreover, that Gygus was smitten, and fled to Tartessus. At that time Gygus ruled over that country, which was then called Acte, but is now named Attica. And whence the other countries and cities derived their names, we think it unnecessary to recount, especially to you who are acquainted with history.

Eusebius of Caesarea in a list of sources mentions his work:

From the three books of Thallus, in which he collects (events) briefly from the fall of Ilion [Troy] to the 167th Olympiad.

However the text is preserved in an Armenian translation where many of the numerals are corrupt. The fall of Troy is 1184 BC, but the editors, Petermann and Karst, highlight that the end-date of the 167th Olympiad (109 BC) is contradicted by George Syncellus, who quotes Sextus Julius Africanus, and suggest that the end-date should read "217th Olympiad" (AD 89–93), a change of one character in Armenian. Others suggest "207th Olympiad" (AD 49-52).

== Thallus and Josephus ==
Josephus may have referred to Thallus in Antiquities of the Jews 18.6.4:

Now there was another Samaritan, a freed-man of Caesar, of whom he borrowed a million of drachmae, and thence repaid Antonia the debt he owed her; and by sending the overplus in paying his court to Caius, became a person of great authority with him.

The identification depends on two assumptions. All the manuscripts have "another Samaritan" (ἄλλος Σαμαρεὺς γένος) in the section, but since Josephus does not refer to a previous Samaritan in this context, all modern editors except one consider it to be a corruption in the text where the Samaritan's name is missing a Θ, and was "Thallos". The second assumption is that the Thallos being named is the same one Eusebius and Africanus were referring to considering that such a name was likely rare at the time.

Others believe that the name Thallos was common at the time so the reference is not clear. A minority have disagreed with the mainstream view above and have suggested that the text is not corrupted and may have read "Now there was another, namely a Samaritan by race (birth), a freedman of Caesar." and not have had a person named Thallos.

== Africanus on Thallus ==
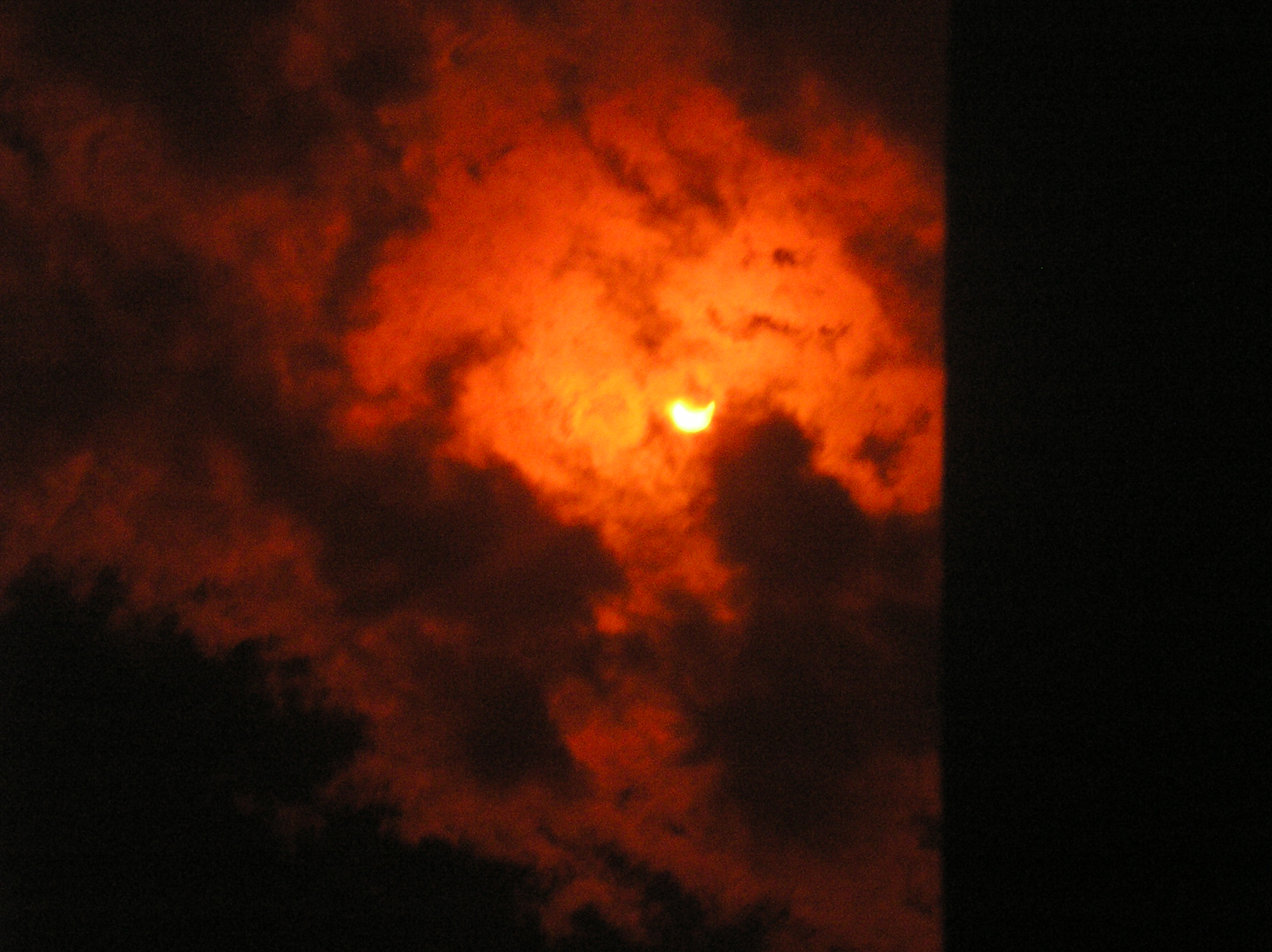
A solar eclipse.

In his Chronicle of Theophanes, 9th-century Christian chronicler George Syncellus cites the Chronographiai of Sextus Julius Africanus as writing in reference to the darkness mentioned in the synoptic gospels as occurring at the death of Jesus:

On the whole world there pressed a most fearful darkness; and the rocks were rent by an earthquake, and many places in Judea and other districts were thrown down. This darkness Thallus, in the third book of his History, calls, as appears to me without reason, an eclipse of the sun. For the Hebrews celebrate the passover on the 14th day according to the moon, and the passion of our Saviour falls on the day before the passover; but an eclipse of the sun takes place only when the moon comes under the sun. And it cannot happen at any other time but in the interval between the first day of the new moon and the last of the old, that is, at their junction: how then should an eclipse be supposed to happen when the moon is almost diametrically opposite the sun? Let that opinion pass however; let it carry the majority with it; and let this portent of the world be deemed an eclipse of the sun, like others a portent only to the eye. Phlegon records that, in the time of Tiberius Caesar, at full moon, there was a full eclipse of the sun from the sixth hour to the ninth — manifestly that one of which we speak. But what has an eclipse in common with an earthquake, the rending rocks, and the resurrection of the dead, and so great a perturbation throughout the universe? Surely no such event as this is recorded for a long period. But it was a darkness induced by God, because the Lord happened then to suffer. And calculation makes out that the period of 70 weeks, as noted in Daniel, is completed at this time.

So it is Africanus that goes on to point out that an eclipse cannot occur at Passover when the moon is full because it is diametrically opposite the Sun.

There is no surviving evidence, however, that Thallus mentioned Jesus or the crucifixion. According to the historian Richard Carrier, this is an erroneous inference by ninth-century chronologer Syncellus who misinterpreted both Africanus and Phlegon. As well as astronomical calculations, indicating any claims of total solar eclipses occurring from 23-43 CE in Jerusalem during Passover being entirely fictional. The darkness mentioned can be a literary device to emphasize cosmic significance, which was common in Greco-Roman and Jewish literature. R. T. France, states that these words of Thallus cannot be known as they were not quoted, but transmitted through Julius Africanus.
