= Lenos (Elis) =

City of antiquity

Lenos (Ancient Greek: Λῆνος) is the name of a city of Pisatis in ancient Elis. Phlegon of Tralles mentions that Lenos had a victor at Olympiad XLVIII of the Ancient Olympic Games (588 BCE). The site of Lenos is unlocated.
