= Prudentius Maran =

French Benedictine scholar (1683–1762)

Prudentius Maran (14 October 1683, at Sezanne, Marne – 2 April 1762, at Paris) was a French Benedictine scholar of the Maurist Congregation, known as a patrologist.

== Life ==
After studying humanities at Paris, Maran became a Benedictine at the Abbey of St. Faron of Meaux on 30 January 1703, and continued his studies at the abbey of St. Denis. He was then sent to Saint-Germain-des-Prés to collaborate with his confrere Antoine-Augustin Touttée in the edition of the works of Cyril of Jerusalem.

In 1734 he was forced to leave St. Germain-des-Pres at the instance of Henri-Pons de Thiard de Bissy, who suspected him of keeping his confreres from accepting the Bull Unigenitus. After spending a year at the abbey of Orbais, he was sent to the abbey of Saint-Martin and in 1737 he was transferred to the abbey of Blancs-Manteaux, where he spent the remainder of his life.

== Works ==
His knowledge of theology and patristics is attested by the introductions which he prefixed to his critical editions of Greek and Latin Fathers, as well as by other works.

His masterpiece is the edition of the works of Justin Martyr: Justini philos. et martyris opera quae extant omnia necnon Tatiani, Athenagorae S. Theophili, Hermiae. He further edited:

- the works of Cyril of Jerusalem which had been prepared by Antoine-Augustin Touttée: S. Cyrilli Hieros. opera;
- the works of Cyprian which had been begun by Étienne Baluze: S. Cypriani opera, to which he prefixed a basic life of Cyprian;
- the third volume of the works of Basil of Caesarea, the two first volumes of which had been completed by Julien Garnier.

His other works, all anonymous, are

- Dissertation sur les Sémiariens (Paris, 1722);
- Divinitas domini nostri Jesu Christi manifesta in scripturis et traditione (Paris, 1746, new ed., Würzburg,1859);
- La divinite de Jesus Christ prouvée contre les hérétiques et les déistes, 3 vols. (Paris, 1751);
- La doctrine de l'écriture et des pères sur les guérisons miraculeuses (Paris, 1754);
- Les grandeurs de Jésus Christ avec la defense de sa divinité (Paris, 1756).
