= Protrepsis and paraenesis =

Two related rhetorical styles of moral exhortation

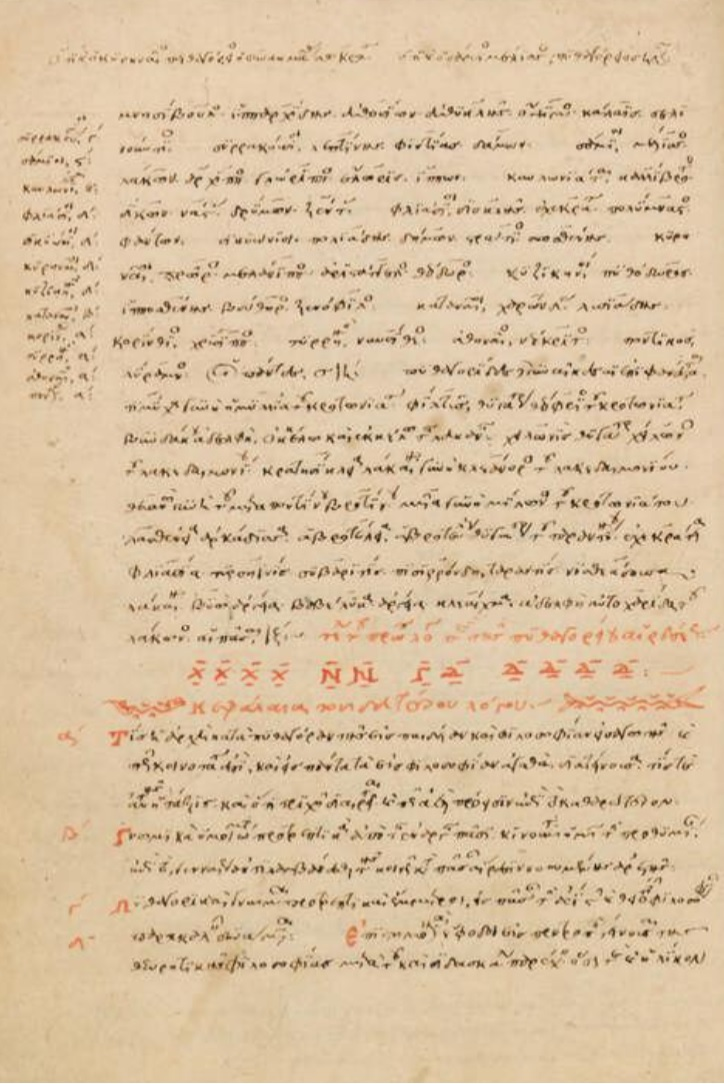
The beginning of the Protrepticus in the oldest and most important manuscript: Florence, Biblioteca Medicea Laurenziana, Plut. 86.3, fol. 46v.

In rhetoric, protrepsis (Ancient Greek: πρότρεψις) and paraenesis (παραίνεσις) are two closely related styles of exhortation that are employed by moral philosophers. While there is a widely accepted distinction between the two that is employed by modern writers, classical philosophers did not make a clear distinction between the two, and even used them interchangeably.

== Differences ==
=== In antiquity ===
Clement of Alexandria differentiated between protrepsis and paraenesis in his Paedagogus. Other writers, however, both before and after him, conflated the two. Pseudo-Justin's protrepsis is entitled an Paraenetic Address to the Greeks and Magnus Felix Ennodius' Paraenesis didascalia is actually in the style of protrepsis.

=== In modernity ===
The modern distinction between the two ideas, as generally used in modern scholarship, is explained by Stanley Stowers thus:

In this discussion I will use protreptic in reference to hortatory literature that calls the audience to a new and different way of life, and paraenesis for advice and exhortation to continue in a certain way of life. The terms however were used this way only sometimes and not consistently in antiquity.

— Stanley Stowers, Letter Writing in Greco-Roman Antiquity

In other words, the distinction often employed by modern writers is that protrepsis is conversion literature, where a philosopher aims to convert outsiders to following a particular philosophical path, whereas paraenesis is aimed at those who already follow that path, giving them advice on how best to follow it. This is not a universally-held distinction. Swancutt, observing Stowers' recognition that the two ideas were not formally distinguished in this way by classical philosophers, argues, for example, that the modern distinction is a false dichotomy that originated with Paul Hartlich's De Exhortationum a Graecis Romanisque scriptarum historia et indole, published in 1889.

Classical writers' perspectives differed from the modern view. For example: Malherbe's explanation of Epictetus' view of protrepsis (as set out in the third of his Discourses) is:

[...] protrepsis is the philosopher's proper mode of exhortation. Together with refutation and reproof, which exposes the human condition [...], and teaching, protrepsis does not make an oratorical display but reveals the inner inconsistency in the philosopher's hearers and brings them to conversion.

— Abraham J. Malherbe, Moral Exhortation

Malherbe defines paraenesis as being "broader in scope than protrepsis", and as "moral exhortation in which someone is advised to pursue or abstain from something". Its formal characteristics include the occurrence of phrases such as "as you know", indicating that the speaker is covering ground that is not new to the listener, but that is considered traditional and already known. The speaker is not instructing the listener, but rather reminding. Other formal characteristics include compliments for already adhering to what is exhorted, encouragement to continue in the same fashion, an example (often delineated antithetically and usually a family member, particularly the speaker's father).

== List of works ==
There have been many writers of protreptics in the ancient world, including:

- Theophrastus
- Antisthenes
- Aristo of Chios
- Cleanthes
- Persaeus of Citium
- Epicurus
- Chrysippus of Soli
- Posidonius
- Augustus
- Seneca
- Musonius Rufus
- Epictetus
- Galen
- Lesbonax of Mytilene
- Clement of Alexandria
- Themistius

== See also ==
- Protrepticus (Aristotle)
- Protrepticus (Clement)
- Hortensius (Cicero)
