= Pseudo-Orpheus =

Jewish poem about Orpheus

Pseudo-Orpheus is the name given to a poetic text that presents the legendary Greek figure Orpheus giving a poetic speech to his son, Musaeus, identified as the biblical Moses, passing on to him hidden wisdom he learned in Egypt. It presents a monotheistic view of God, whom, according to the poem, no one has seen, except for Abraham, who was able to see God due to his skill at astrology.

Pseudo-Orpheus appears in multiple recensions (versions created over time). Although the poem is preserved only in quotations by various Christian writers, most scholars believe that the text is originally "of Jewish authorship." Over time, a number of Christian and Jewish authors reworked Greek traditions about Orpheus and used them to support their monotheistic views and to assert the religious supremacy of Moses and monotheism over Greek polytheistic views. The rhetorical device of using legendary non-monotheistic figures to endorse Judaism is likewise found in the Sibylline Oracles.

== Preserved versions ==
The following are the primary forms of Pseudo-Orpheus that have survived to the present. The exact dating of the various recensions is disputed.

The first extant writer who quotes the work is Clement of Alexandria, who lived around 150 to 215 AD. Clement provides "numerous short quotations" from Pseudo-Orpheus, with one (abbreviated C_{2}) matching the edition of Eusebius, and the rest (collectively known as C_{1}) mostly–but not exclusively–in agreement with the version of the poem known as J (see below).

The recension which appears in Eusebius (abbreviated E) seems to have been produced in the 2nd or 1st century BC. Eusebius claims to have taken the poem from the writings of Aristobulus of Alexandria, a Hellenistic Jewish philosopher who lived in the 2nd century BC. This version is known as the Mosaic recension because of its focus on Moses. This version is variously counted at either forty-one or forty-six lines of hexameter verse.

A shorter recension appears in the works of an author referred to as Pseudo-Justin (approximately or at some unknown point before 300 AD) who is so called because his original name is not known, although he was for a time confused with the 2nd-century writer Justin Martyr. This version contains 21 lines and is referred to as J.

Another recension, known as T, or the "Theosophical" recension, contains all the lines found in the other versions of the poem, and mostly agrees with E. This version is found in the Tübingen Theosophy or Theosophy of Tübingen, "an epitome of a late-fifth century collection of oracles".
