= Crucifixion darkness =

Christian gospel episode of darkened sky

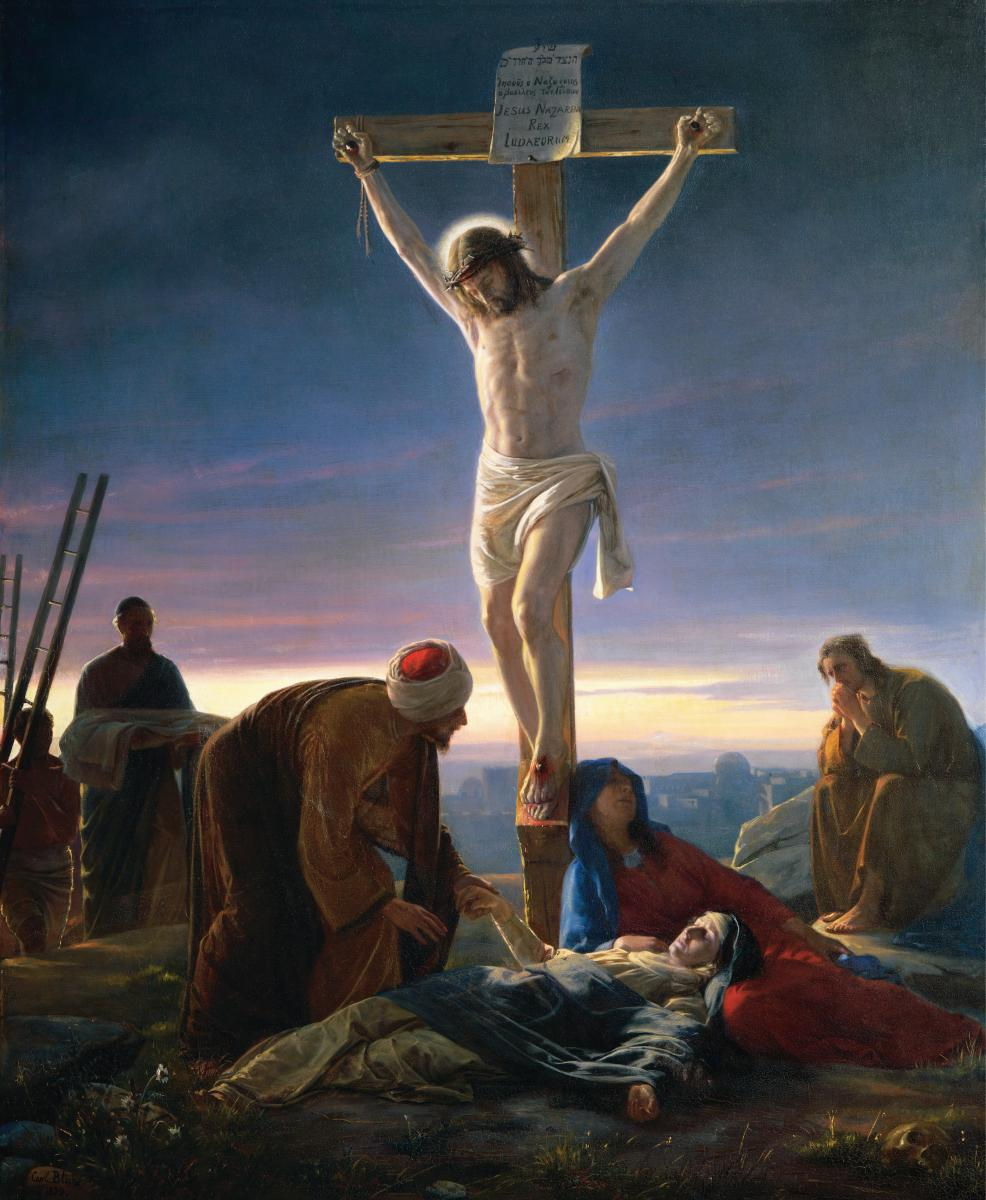
Christ on the Cross, 1870, by Carl Heinrich Bloch, showing the skies darkened

The crucifixion darkness is an event described in the synoptic gospels in which the sky becomes dark in daytime during the crucifixion of Jesus for roughly three hours. Most ancient and medieval Christian writers treated this as a miracle, and believed it to be one of the few episodes from the New Testament which were confirmed by non-Christian sources. Modern scholars have found references by early historians to accounts of this event outside the New Testament, although no copies of the referenced accounts survive.

In his Apologeticus, Christian apologist Tertullian in AD 197 considered this not an eclipse but an omen, which is recorded in Roman archives. In his apologetic work Contra Celsum, the third-century Christian scholar Origen offered two natural explanations for the darkness: that it might have been the eclipse described by Phlegon of Tralles in his Chronicle or that it might have been clouds. In his Chronicle of Theophanes the fifth-century chronicler George Syncellus quotes the History of the World of Sextus Julius Africanus as stating that a world eclipse and an earthquake in Judea had been reported by the Greek 1st century historian Thallus in his Histories.

== Biblical accounts ==
The oldest extant references to the crucifixion darkness are found in all three synoptic gospels (Matthew, Mark, and Luke). The majority view among scholars is that Matthew was a product of the last quarter of the 1st century. (Note: This view is based on three arguments: (a) the setting reflects the final separation of Church and Synagogue, about 85 AD; (b) it reflects the capture of Jerusalem and destruction of the Temple by the Romans in 70 AD; (c) it uses Mark, usually dated c. 70 AD, as a source. (See R. T. France (2007), The Gospel of Matthew, p. 18.) France himself is not convinced by the majority – see his Commentary, pp. 18–19. Allison adds that "Ignatius of Antioch, the Didache, and Papias—all from the first part of the second century—show knowledge of Matthew, which accordingly must have been composed before 100 CE. (See e.g. Ign., Smyrn. 1; Did. 8.2.)" See Dale Allison, "Matthew" in Muddiman and Barton's The Gospels (Oxford Bible Commentary), Oxford 2010, p27.) The majority also believe that Mark was the first gospel to be composed and that Matthew (who includes some 600 of Mark's 661 verses) and Luke both drew upon it as a major source for their works. Matthew did not simply copy Mark, but used it as a base, emphasizing Jesus' place in the Jewish tradition and including other details not covered in Mark.

Composition of the Gospel of Mark is usually dated through the eschatological discourse in Mark 13. Most scholars interpret this as pointing to the First Jewish–Roman War (66–74 AD) that would lead to the destruction of the Second Temple in AD 70, with the composition of Mark taking place either immediately after the destruction (the majority position) or during the years immediately prior. Earlier dates in the range AD 35–45 are sometimes proposed, but are usually dismissed.

The text of the Gospel of Matthew reads: "From noon on, darkness came over the whole land [or, earth] until three in the afternoon." The author includes dramatic details following the death of Jesus, including an earthquake and the raising of the dead, which were also common motifs in Jewish apocalyptic literature: "At that moment the curtain of the temple was torn in two from top to bottom. The earth shook, and the rocks were split. The tombs also were opened, and many bodies of the saints who had fallen asleep were raised."

The Gospel of Mark concurs with the timing of events, stating that, on preparation day (the eve of the Sabbath), Jesus was crucified at around 9 o'clock ("the third hour"), and at around noon ("the sixth hour"), darkness fell over all the land, or all the world (Ancient Greek: γῆν, romanized: gēn can mean either) until 3 o'clock ("the ninth hour"). It adds, immediately after the death of Jesus, "The curtain of the temple was torn in two, from top to bottom", but does not mention an earthquake or the opening of tombs.

The Gospel of Luke concurs with the length and timing of the darkness, but also does not mention an earthquake or the opening of tombs. Contrary to Matthew and Mark, however, the text mentions the tearing of the Temple veil prior to the death of Jesus, and provides the obscuring of the Sun as the cause of the darkness:

It was now about noon, and darkness came over the whole land [or, earth] until three in the afternoon, while the sun's light failed [or, the sun was eclipsed]; and the curtain of the temple was torn in two.

It appears that Luke may have originally explained the event as a miraculous solar eclipse. The majority of manuscripts of the Gospel of Luke have the Greek phrase eskotisthe ho helios ("the sun was darkened"), but the earliest manuscripts say tou heliou eklipontos ("the sun's light failed" or "the sun was in eclipse"). This earlier version may have been amended by later scribes to correct what they assumed was an error, since Passover occurs during a full moon but a solar eclipse occurs during a new moon. Furthermore, a total eclipse could mean darkness at one location of up to a maximum of seven and a half minutes, whereas the gospel texts state that the darkness covered the land for roughly three hours. For these reasons, one early Christian commentator suggested that the early text attributing the event to an eclipse had been deliberately corrupted by opponents of the Church to make it easier to attack on naturalist grounds.

In the account of the crucifixion given in the Gospel of John, which is generally accepted to have been written much later and which focuses on different themes, events, and sayings than the synoptic gospels, there is no mention of darkness, the tearing of the veil, the earthquake, nor the raising of the dead.

== Apocryphal writers ==
The Gospel of Peter, probably from the second century AD, expanded on the canonical gospel accounts in creative ways. As one writer puts it, "accompanying miracles become more fabulous and the apocalyptic portents are more vivid". In this version, the darkness which covers the whole of Judaea leads people to go about with lamps believing it to be night.

The fourth century Gospel of Nicodemus describes how Pilate and his wife are disturbed by a report of what had happened, and the Judeans he has summoned tell him it was an ordinary solar eclipse.

Another text from the fourth century, the purported Report of Pontius Pilate to Tiberius, claimed the darkness had started at the sixth hour, covered the whole world, and during the subsequent evening the full moon resembled blood for the entire night.

Pseudo-Dionysius the Areopagite, a 5th or 6th century anonymous author writing under the name of Dionysius the Areopagite, claims to have observed a solar eclipse from Heliopolis at the time of the crucifixion.

== Ancient historians ==
Tertullian, in his Apologeticus of AD 197, referred to the crucifixion darkness and claimed that an independent account of the omen was held in the Roman archives:

And yet, nailed upon the cross, He exhibited many notable signs, by which His death was distinguished from all others. At His own free-will, He with a word dismissed from Him His spirit, anticipating the executioner's work. In the same hour, too, the light of day was withdrawn, when the sun at the very time was in his meridian blaze. Those who were not aware that this had been predicted about Christ, no doubt thought it an eclipse. You yourselves have the account of the world-portent still in your archives.

In AD 248, the crucifixion darkness story was used by the Christian apologist Origen as an example of the biblical account being supported by non-Christian sources: when the pagan critic Celsus claimed that Jesus could hardly be a God because he had performed no great deeds, Origen responded, in Against Celsus (AD 248), by recounting the darkness, earthquake and opening of tombs. As proof that the incident had happened, Origen referred to a description by the Chronicles of Phlegon of Tralles of an eclipse, accompanied by earthquakes felt in other parts of the Empire during the reign of Tiberius. However, with his Commentary on Matthew (c. 246-248 AD), Origen offered a different approach. Answering criticisms that there was no mention of this incident in non-Christian sources by insisting it was local to Palestine. To suggestions that it was merely an eclipse, Origen pointed out that this was impossible and offered other explanations, such as heavy and dark clouds, drawing only on the accounts given in Matthew and Mark, which make no mention of the sun.

In his Chronicle of Theophanes, 9th-century Christian chronicler George Syncellus cites the History of the World of Sextus Julius Africanus as writing in reference to the darkness mentioned in the synoptic gospels as occurring at the death of Jesus:

On the whole world there pressed a most fearful darkness; and the rocks were rent by an earthquake, and many places in Judea and other districts were thrown down. This darkness Thallus, in the third book of his History, calls, as appears to me without reason, an eclipse of the sun. For the Hebrews celebrate the passover on the 14th day according to the moon, and the passion of our Saviour fails on the day before the passover; but an eclipse of the sun takes place only when the moon comes under the sun. And it cannot happen at any other time but in the interval between the first day of the new moon and the last of the old, that is, at their junction: how then should an eclipse be supposed to happen when the moon is almost diametrically opposite the sun? Let that opinion pass however; let it carry the majority with it; and let this portent of the world be deemed an eclipse of the sun, like others a portent only to the eye. Phlegon records that, in the time of Tiberius Caesar, at full moon, there was a full eclipse of the sun from the sixth hour to the ninth – manifestly that one of which we speak. But what has an eclipse in common with an earthquake, the rending rocks, and the resurrection of the dead, and so great a perturbation throughout the universe? Surely no such event as this is recorded for a long period. But it was a darkness induced by God, because the Lord happened then to suffer. And calculation makes out that the period of 70 weeks, as noted in Daniel, is completed at this time.

== Book of Mormon ==
In the Book of Mormon, which the Latter Day Saint movement claims as scripture, an account is given of a period of darkness in the New World (Western Hemisphere) at the time of Christ's crucifixion and death. It is recorded as three days of darkness after a period of extreme storms and devastation, which lasted three hours. Following the three days of darkness an account is given of the visit of the resurrected Jesus Christ to the inhabitants of the Western Hemisphere.

== Explanations ==
=== Miracle ===
Because it was known in ancient and medieval times that a solar eclipse could not take place during Passover (solar eclipses require a new moon while Passover only takes place during a full moon), it was considered a miraculous sign rather than a naturally occurring event. The astronomer Johannes de Sacrobosco wrote, in his The Sphere of the World, "the eclipse was not natural, but, rather, miraculous and contrary to nature". Modern writers who regard this as a miraculous event tend either to see it as operating through a natural phenomenon—such as volcanic dust or heavy cloud cover—or avoid an explanation completely. The Reformation Study Bible, for instance, simply states "This was a supernatural darkness."

=== Natural phenomenon ===
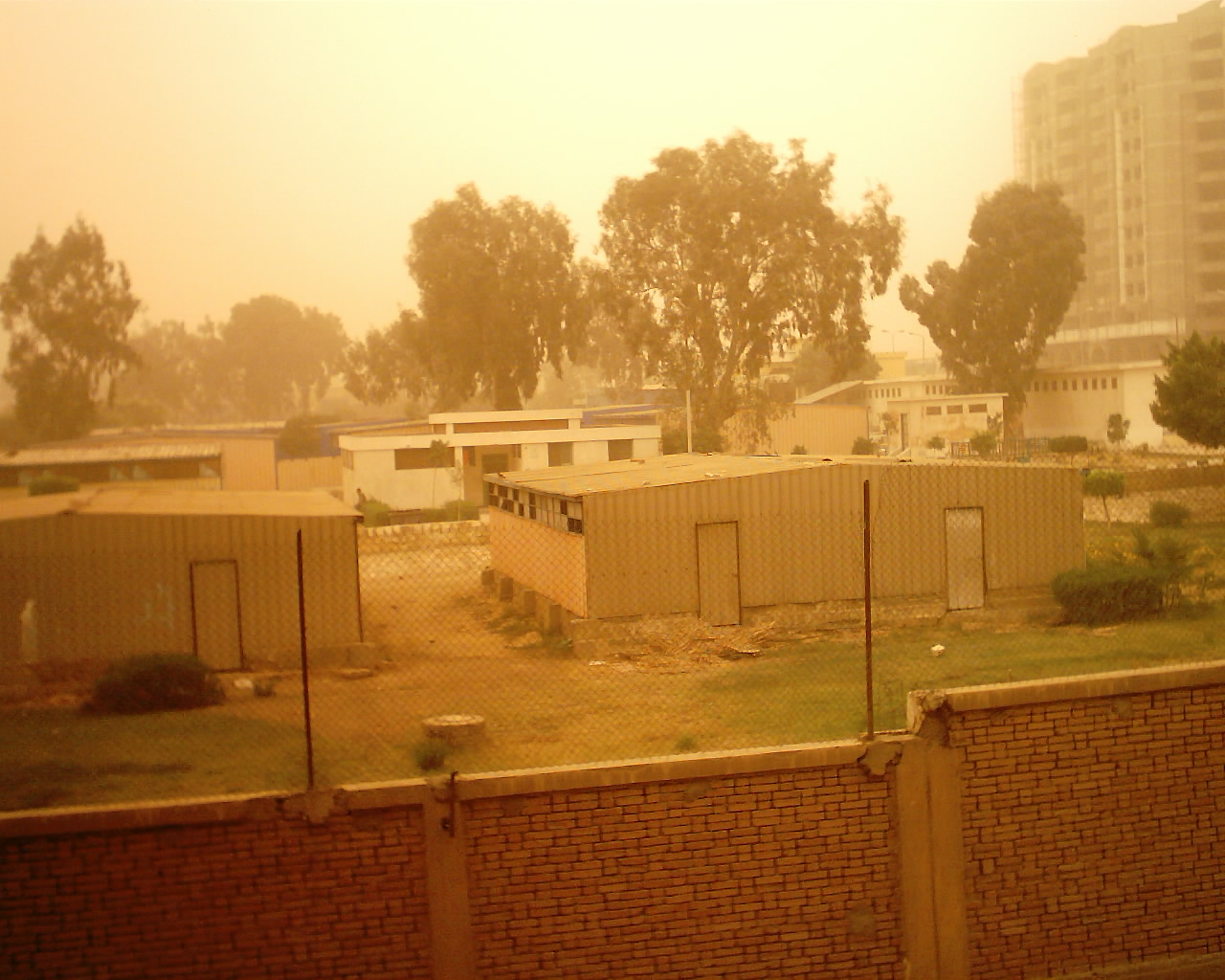
Khamsin dust storm in Egypt in 2007

The Gospel of Luke account states "and the sun was darkened". However, the biblical details do not accord with an eclipse: a solar eclipse could not have occurred on or near the Passover, when Jesus was crucified, and would have been too brief to account for three hours of darkness. The maximum possible duration of a total solar eclipse is seven minutes and 31.1 seconds.

Some writers explained the crucifixion darkness in terms of solar storms, heavy cloud cover, or the aftermath of a volcanic eruption. A popular work of the nineteenth century described it as an 'oppressive gloom' and suggested this was a typical phenomenon related to earthquakes.

In his 2011 book, unlike his 1983 paper, Humphreys accepted that Luke was referring to the Sun, and proposed a khamsin dust storm that tends to occur from March to May and typically obscures the sun for several hours.

=== Scribal error ===
In 1983, Colin Humphreys and W. G. Waddington noted that the reference to a solar eclipse is missing in some versions of Luke and argued that the reported sun's darkness could be accounted for by confusion with a partial lunar eclipse that had taken place on 3 April AD 33: lunar eclipses can last much longer than solar ones, with its penumbral duration listed in eclipse data of 5 hours, 32 minutes, and 50 seconds at its maximum extent near Indonesia. In other words, Humphreys and Waddington speculated that the apparent reference in Luke's Gospel to a solar eclipse could have been the result of a scribe wrongly amending Luke's original text. This claim is described as "indefensible" by David Henige. NASA has noted that some scholars believe a possible date of crucifixion was on that date as a result of the known lunar eclipse. However, this date is not universally accepted among Christian scholars, and astronomer Bradley E. Schaefer stated that the lunar eclipse would not have been visible in Jerusalem during daylight hours and would not account for darkness on earth. As a result of these issues, Dr. Faulkner of the evangelical Answers in Genesis cautioned against using this argument.

=== Literary creation ===
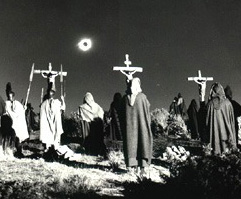
A scene of the film Barabbas (1961) in which a total solar eclipse that occurred on February 15, 1961, was used to recreate the crucifixion darkness

Starting from the Enlightenment, it has become a common view in modern scholarship to read the account in the synoptic gospels as a literary creation of the gospel writers, intended to heighten the importance of what they saw as a theologically significant event. The first scholar to support this view was Edward Gibbon, who argued in his multi-volume work The History of the Decline and Fall of the Roman Empire that the gospels' account could not be considered historical, since no author of the period seemed to have noticed the event and the sources usually adduced to support its historicity were of dubious value (Thallus and Phlegon of Tralles) or later pseudepigrapha (Pseudo-Dionysius the Areopagite). Gibbon was followed, some decades later, by German theologian David Strauss, who argued in his book Das Leben Jesu, kritisch bearbeitet (The Life of Jesus, Critically Examined) that the crucifixion darkness was a literary creation to solemnize the tragic death of the Jesus.

These arguments have been largely accepted by modern scholarship. Burton Mack describes the darkness as a fabrication by the author of the Gospel of Mark, while G. B. Caird and Joseph Fitzmyer conclude that the author did not intend the description to be taken literally. W. D. Davies and Dale Allison similarly conclude "It is probable that, without any factual basis, darkness was added in order to wrap the cross in a rich symbol and/or assimilate Jesus to other worthies".

Raymond E. Brown argues that the crucifixion darkness is a theological and literary creation, using apocalyptic language taken from the Old Testament, noting the silence of contemporary authors such as Pliny the Elder and Seneca the Younger, who would certainly have noted such an extraordinary event, had it really happened.

The image of darkness over the land would have been understood by ancient readers as a cosmic sign, a typical element in the description of the death of kings and other major figures by writers such as Philo, Dio Cassius, Virgil, Plutarch and Josephus. Géza Vermes describes the darkness account as "part of the Jewish eschatological imagery of the day of the Lord. It is to be treated as a literary rather than historical phenomenon notwithstanding naive scientists and over-eager television documentary makers, tempted to interpret the account as a datable eclipse of the sun. They would be barking up the wrong tree".

== Interpretations ==
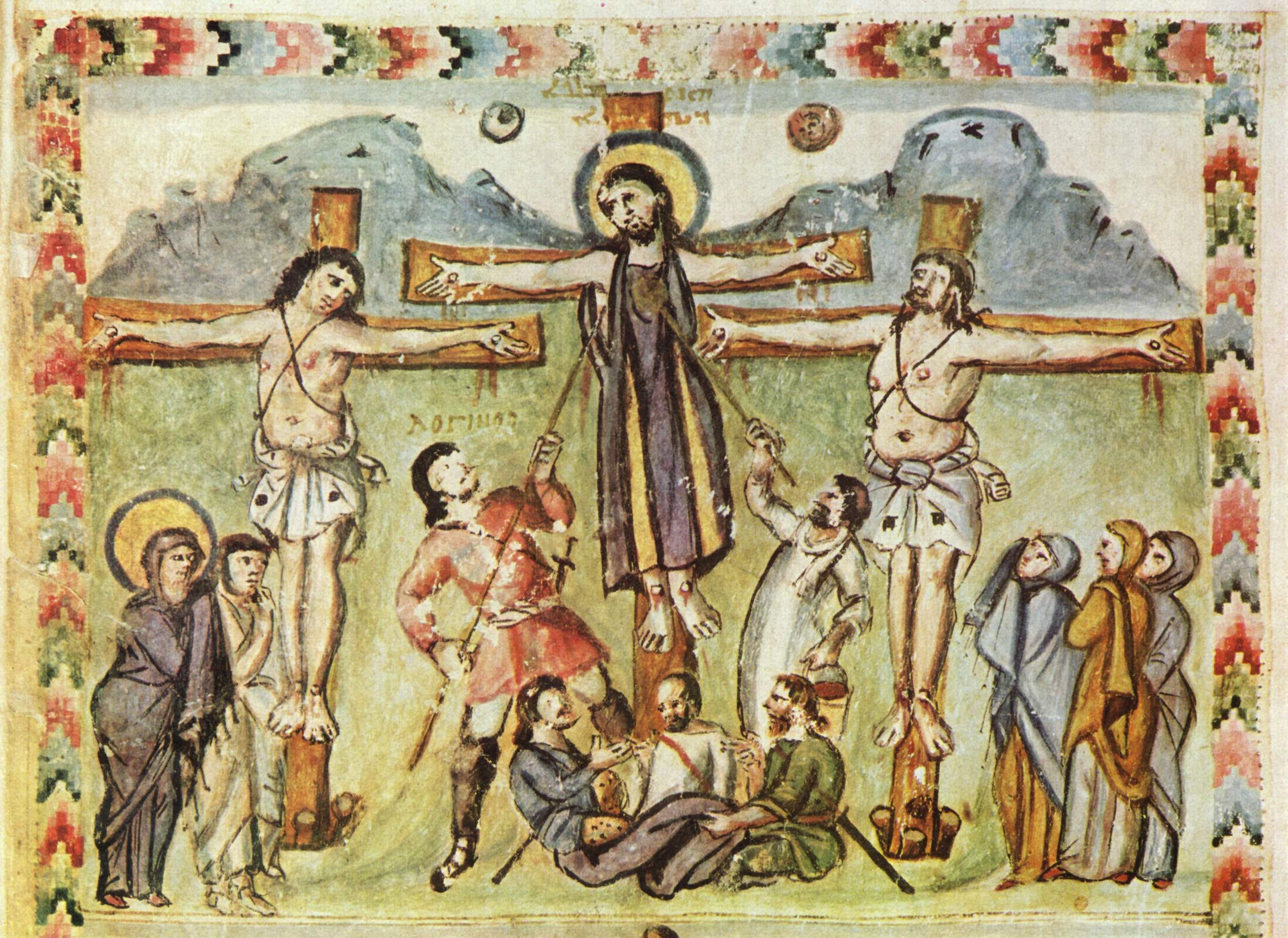
The earliest crucifixion in an illuminated manuscript, from the Syriac Rabbula Gospels, AD 586: note the Sun and Moon in the sky.

This sequence plays an important part in the gospel's literary narrative. The author of Mark's gospel has been described as operating here "at the peak of his rhetorical and theological powers". One suggestion is that the darkness is a deliberate inversion of the transfiguration; alternatively, Jesus's earlier discourse about a future tribulation mentions the Sun being darkened, and can be seen as foreshadowing this scene. Striking details such as the darkening of the sky and the tearing of the Temple veil may be a way of focusing the reader away from the shame and humiliation of the crucifixion; one professor of biblical theology concluded, "it is clear that Jesus is not a humiliated criminal but a man of great significance. His death is therefore not a sign of his weakness but of his power."

When considering the theological meaning of the event, some authors have interpreted the darkness as a period of mourning by the cosmos itself at the death of Jesus. Others have seen it as a sign of God's judgement on the Jewish people, sometimes connecting it with the destruction of the city of Jerusalem in the year 70; or as symbolising shame, fear, or the mental suffering of Jesus. Fitzmyer compares the event to a contemporary description recorded in Josephus' Antiquities of the Jews, which recounts "unlawful acts against the gods, from which we believe the very sun turned away, as if it too were loath to look upon the foul deed".

Many writers have adopted an intertextual approach, looking at earlier texts from which the author of the Mark Gospel may have drawn. In particular, parallels have often been noted between the darkness and the prediction in the Book of Amos of an earthquake in the reign of King Uzziah of Judah: "On that day, says the Lord God, I will make the sun go down at noon, and darken the earth in broad daylight". Particularly in connection with this reference, read as a prophecy of the future, the darkness can be seen as portending the end times.

Another likely literary source is the plague narrative in the Book of Exodus, in which Egypt is covered by darkness for three days. It has been suggested that the author of Matthew's gospel changed the Marcan text slightly to more closely match this source. Commentators have also drawn comparisons with the description of darkness in the Genesis creation narrative, with a prophecy regarding mid-day darkness by Jeremiah, and with an end-times prophecy in the Book of Zechariah.

== See also ==
- Muhammad's eclipse
