= Oratio ad Graecos =

Oratio ad Graecos, in English Discourse to the Greeks or Address to the Greeks, may refer to:

- Discourse to the Greeks concerning Hades by Hippolytus of Rome
- Oratio ad Graecos by Tatian
- Oratio ad Graecos, erroneously attributed to Justin Martyr
