= Pseudo-Justin =

Pseudo-Justin is the designation used by scholars for the anonymous author of any work falsely attributed to Justin Martyr, such as the following:

- Exhortation to the Greeks
- Oratio ad Graecos
- Answers to the Orthodox Faithful Concerning Some Necessary Questions (Quaestiones et responsiones ad orthodoxos)
- De resurrectione, possibly written by Athenagoras of Athens or Hippolytus of Rome
- Expositio rectae fidei, possibly written by Theodoret of Cyrrhus
- De monarchia, which contains a poem by Pseudo-Orpheus
