= Oratio ad Graecos (Pseudo-Justin) =

Oratio ad Graecos is a short Christian apologetic treatise in Greek from the first half of the third century. It consists of five chapters in which the author describes his abhorrence of the ancient Greek religion and its immorality and justifies his decision to convert to Christianity. It ends with an appeal to his fellow Greeks to convert also. It was translated into Syriac before the seventh century.

== Manuscripts and editions ==
The Greek text of the Oratio is preserved in a single manuscript tradition, of which the Vorlage was Codex Argentoratensis gr. 9, kept in the municipal library of Strasbourg. This copy, dated to the thirteenth or fourteenth century, was lacunose and corrupt. It was destroyed in a fire during the siege of Strasbourg on 24 August 1870, but not before it was copied twice: around 1580 in the Codex Tubingensis M. b. 27 and in 1586 by Henri Estienne for the first edition he was preparing (published 1592). It has since been published several times, by Friedrich Sylburg (1593), Prudentius Maran (1742), Carl von Otto (1879) and Adolf von Harnack (1896).

At an early stage, a Greek bouleutes (senator) named Ambrose produced an excerpted, expanded and vulgarized version of the Greek text under the title Ύπομνήματα (Hypomnemata). This version of the Oratio, which does not survive, was at some point translated into Syriac. This version survives in a single manuscript of the seventh century, Codex Nitriacus, Mus. Brit. Add. 14658.

== Author and date ==
The Oratio was traditionally attributed to Justin Martyr, although this attribution does not seem to have been current yet in the time of Eusebius (died 339). The lost Strasbourg manuscript contained this attribution. The first scholar to reject this attribution was John Ernest Grabe in 1699. The florid and rhetorical style is quite unlike Justin's. The Syriac text does not have the attribution to Justin. Today it is generally rejected and the author is known as Pseudo-Justin.

Thomas Falls dates the Oratio to the second half of the second or first quarter of the third century. Harnack dates it to between 180 and 240. The terminus post quem (earliest possible date) is provided by the writings of Clement of Alexandria (died 215), which influenced the author. The terminus ante quem (latest possible date) is the criminalization of pederasty during the reign of Philip the Arab (r. 244–249), since the author refers to pederasty as a sin but not a crime. In addition, Methodius of Olympus (died 311) may have known the Oratio.

== Content ==
The influence of Stoicism and Cynicism is apparent in the Oratio. The ancient Greek religion, including the hero cults and the festivals, is roundly criticized as immoral. Four vices are emphasised: ἐπιθυμία (epithymia, desire), ἀκρασία (akrasia, weakness), λύσσα (lyssa, rage) and ανανδρία (anandria, unmanliness). Of these, desire or passion which "grows by all means" is the worst.

The beginning of the Oratio reads:

Do not imagine, my Greek friends, that I am rash and unreasonable in refusing to practice your customs, for I have discovered that they are in no way holy or pleasing to God. Indeed, the very writings of your poets stand as permanent testimonials of madness and perversity. Whoever becomes a pupil of your most learned one [Homer] encounters more difficulties than any man ever faced. Because, first of all, they affirm that Agamemnon, in assisting his brother's sensuality with great madness and unrestrained passion, did not hesitate to hand over his own daughter to be immolated.

== Bibliography ==
=== Editions ===
- Discourse to the Greeks, trans. Thomas B. Falls, in The Fathers of the Church: A New Translation (Catholic University of America Press, 1948), vol. 6, pp. 427–436.
- Oratio ad Graecos, ed. Miroslav Marcovich, in Pseudo-Iustinus, Cohortatio ad Graecos / De monarchia / Oratio ad Graecos, Patristische Texte und Studien 32 (De Gruyter, 1990), pp. 103–119. doi:10.1515/9783110872255

=== Secondary literature ===
- Goodenough, Erwin R. "The Pseudo-Justinian 'Oratio ad Graecos'." The Harvard Theological Review 18, 2 (1925): 187–200. JSTOR 1507696
