= Prooftext =

Passage of scripture presented as proof for a theological doctrine, belief, or principle

In biblical interpretation, a prooftext is a passage of scripture presented as proof for a theological doctrine, belief, or principle. Prooftexting (sometimes "proof-texting" or "proof texting") is the practice of using quotations from a document, either for the purpose of exegesis, or to establish a proposition in eisegesis (introducing one's own presuppositions, agendas, or biases). Such quotes may not accurately reflect the original intent of the author, and a document quoted in such a manner, when read as a whole, may not support the proposition for which it was cited. The term has currency primarily in theological and exegetical circles.

== See also ==
- Quote mining
