= Abbey of Saint-Martin, Pontoise =

Abbey in Pontoise, France

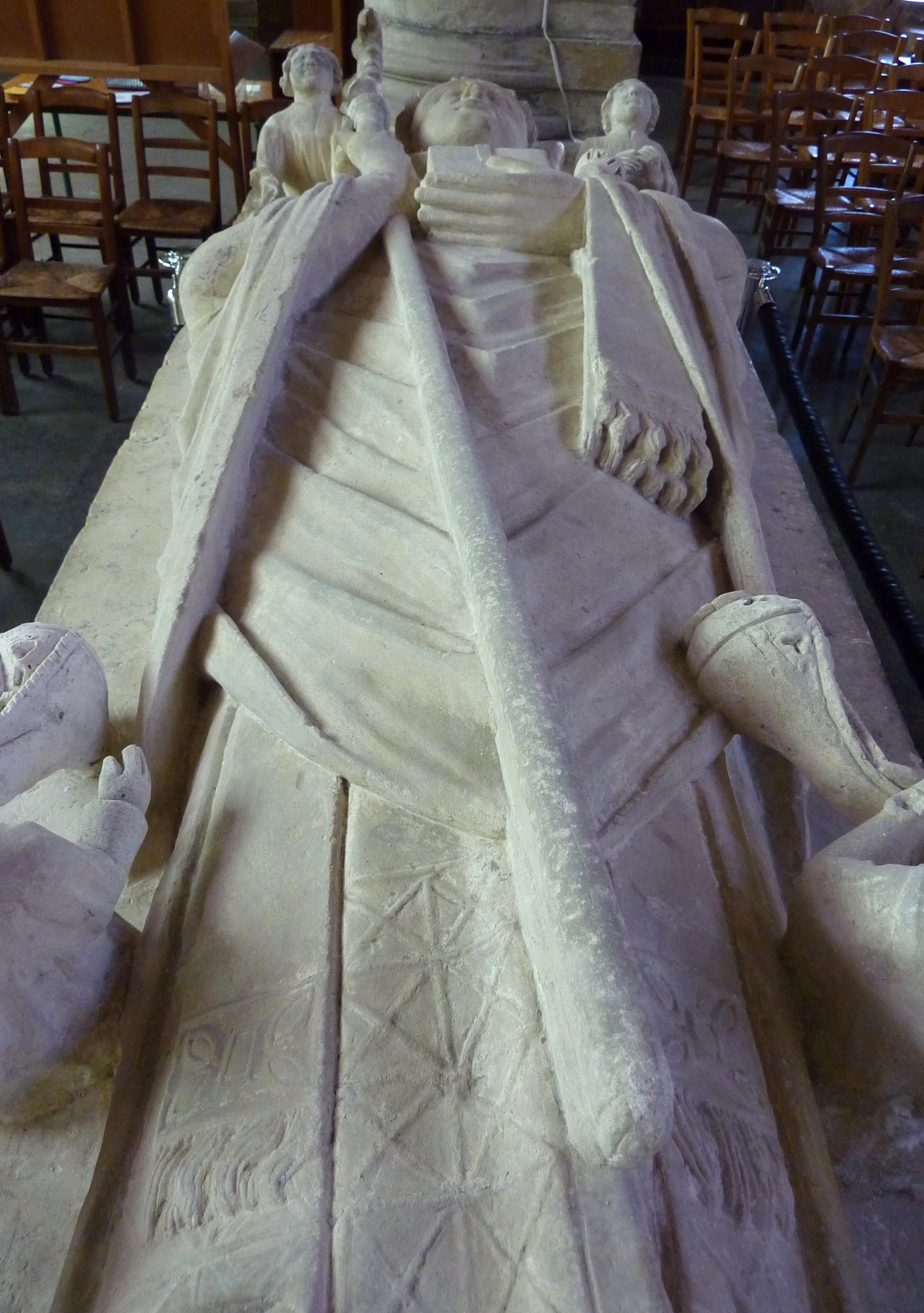
Tomb of Saint Walter of Pontoise in the abbey church

The Abbey of Saint-Martin in Pontoise, in the Val-d'Oise department of the Île-de-France region of France was founded in the first half of the 11th century. The abbey was an important centre of pilgrimage due to the canonisation of its first abbot Walter of Pontoise. The Benedictine abbey was taken over by Maurists in the 17th century. The Saint-Martin estate now houses the Saint-Martin-de-France School, run by the Oratorians.
