= Antoine-Augustin Touttée =

French Benedictine scholar

Antoine-Augustin Touttée (13 December 1677 – 25 December 1718) was a French Benedictine scholar of the Maurist Congregation.

== Life ==
Touttée was born at Riom, Puy-de-Dôme. He studied the humanities with the Oratorians at Riom, made vows at the Abbey of Vendôme, 29 October 1698, and was ordained priest in December, 1702. He taught philosophy at Vendôme from 1702 to 1704 and theology at Saint-Benoît-sur-Loire from 1704 to 1708, and at St-Denis from 1708 to 1712.

== Works ==
He then withdrew to St-Germain-des-Prés to prepare a new Greek edition and Latin translation of the works of Cyril of Jerusalem. He died at the Abbey of St. Germain-des-Prés, aged 41. His translation was issued after his death by Prudent Maran under the title: "S. Cyrilli Hiersolymit. opera quae extant omnia et ejus nomine circumferunter; ad mss. codd. castigata" (Paris, 1720; also in Patrologia Graeca, XXXIII). It is preceded by three learned dissertations on the life, writings, and doctrine of Cyril, and was at the time the standard edition.
