= Justin Martyr =

2nd-century Christian apologist and martyr

Saint Justin Martyr
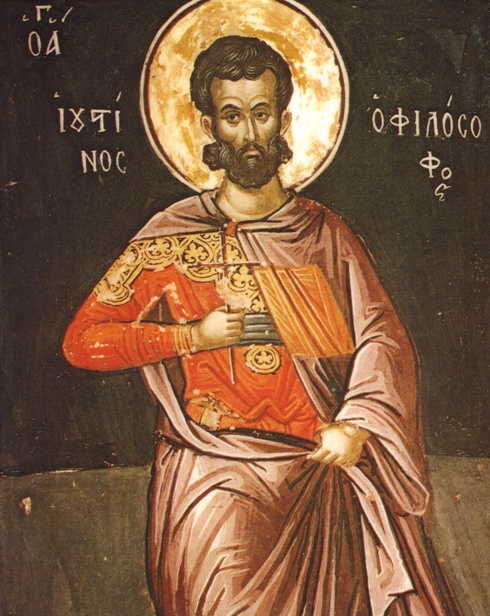
- 15th-century icon of Justin Martyr by Theophanes the Cretan

Martyr
- Born: c. AD 90 – 100; Flavia Neapolis, Judaea, Roman Empire
- Died: c. AD 165 (aged 65 – 75); Rome, Italia, Roman Empire
- Venerated in: Catholic Church; Eastern Orthodox Church; Oriental Orthodoxy; Lutheranism; Anglicanism
- Canonized: Pre-Congregation
- Feast: 1 June (Catholic Church, Eastern Orthodox Church, Lutheranism, Anglicanism); 14 April (Roman Calendar, 1882–1969)
- Patronage: Philosophers
- Other name: Justin the Philosopher

Philosophical work
- Era: Ancient philosophy
- School: Middle Platonism
- Main interests: Apologetics
- Notable works: First Apology; Dialogue with Trypho
- Notable ideas: Logos; Virtuous pagan; Second Coming; Last Adam; Second Eve

Justin Martyr (Greek: Ἰουστῖνος ὁ Μάρτυς, romanized: Ioustînos ho Mártys; c. 90–100 AD – 165 AD), also known as Justin the Philosopher, was an early Christian apologist and philosopher. The First Apology, his most well-known text, passionately defends the morality of the Christian life and provides various arguments to convince the Roman emperor Antoninus Pius to abandon persecution of the Church. Justin also indicates that historical manifestations of the Logos predated Christ's incarnation, and that many historical Greek philosophers (including Socrates and Plato) were unknowing Christians.

Justin was martyred, along with some of his students, during the reign of Marcus Aurelius around the year 165, and is venerated as a saint by the Catholic Church, the Eastern Orthodox Church, the Oriental Orthodox Churches, Lutheran Churches, and in Anglicanism.

== Life ==
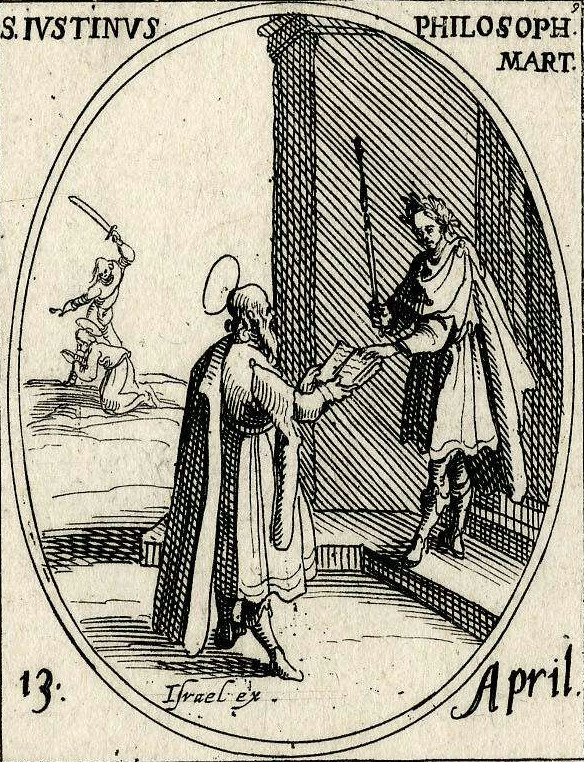
A bearded Justin Martyr presenting an open book to a Roman emperor. Engraving by Jacques Callot.

Justin was born c. AD 90–100, into a Greek family, at Flavia Neapolis (today Nablus) near the ancient biblical city of Shechem, in Samaria. He knew little or no Hebrew and Aramaic, and had only a passing acquaintance with Judaism. He was uncircumcised, and defined himself as a Gentile. His grandfather, Bacchius, had a Greek name, while his father, Priscus, bore a Latin name, which has led to speculations that his ancestors may have settled in Neapolis soon after its establishment or that they were descended from a Roman "diplomatic" community that had been sent there.

In the opening of the Dialogue, Justin describes his early education, stating that his initial studies left him unsatisfied due to their failure to provide a belief system that would afford theological and metaphysical inspiration to their young pupil. He says he tried first the school of a Stoic philosopher, who was unable to explain God's being to him. He then attended a Peripatetic philosopher but was put off because the philosopher was too eager for his fee. Then he went to hear a Pythagorean philosopher who demanded that he first learn music, astronomy, and geometry, which he did not wish to do. Subsequently, he adopted Platonism after encountering a Platonist thinker who had recently settled in his city. (Note: And the perception of immaterial things quite overpowered me, and the contemplation of ideas furnished my mind with wings, so that in a little while I supposed that I had become wise; and such was my stupidity, I expected forthwith to look upon God, for this is the end of Plato's philosophy.)

Some time afterwards, he chanced upon an old man, possibly a Syrian Christian, in the vicinity of the seashore, who engaged him in a dialogue about God and spoke of the testimony of the prophets as being more reliable than the reasoning of philosophers.

There existed, long before this time, certain men more ancient than all those who are esteemed philosophers, both righteous and beloved by God, who spoke by the Divine Spirit, and foretold events which would take place, and which are now taking place. They are called prophets. These alone both saw and announced the truth to men, neither reverencing nor fearing any man, not influenced by a desire for glory, but speaking those things alone which they saw and which they heard, being filled with the Holy Spirit. Their writings are still extant, and he who has read them is very much helped in his knowledge of the beginning and end of things, and of those matters which the philosopher ought to know, provided he has believed them... But pray that, above all things, the gates of light may be opened to you; for these things cannot be perceived or understood by all, but only by the man to whom God and His Christ have imparted wisdom.

Moved by the aged man's argument, Justin renounced both his former religious faith and his philosophical background, choosing instead to rededicate his life to the service of the Divine. His newfound convictions were bolstered by the ascetic lives of the early Christians and the heroic example of the martyrs, whose piety convinced him of the moral and spiritual superiority of Christian doctrine. As a result, he thenceforth decided that the only option for him was to travel throughout the land, spreading the knowledge of Christianity as the "true philosophy." His conversion is commonly assumed to have taken place at Ephesus though it may have occurred anywhere on the road from Syria Palestina to Rome.

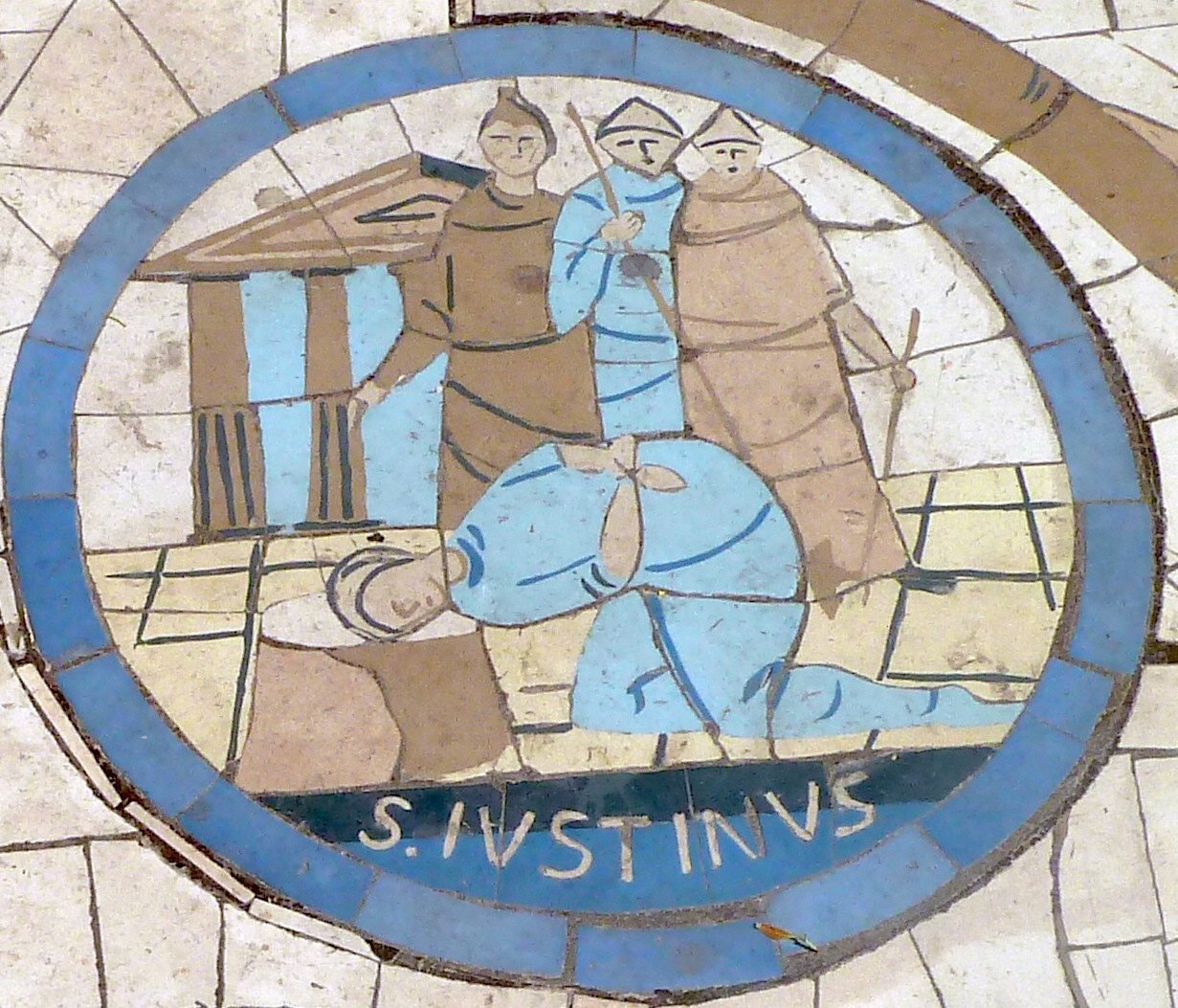
Mosaic of the beheading of Justin Martyr

He then adopted the dress of a philosopher himself and traveled about teaching. During the reign of Antoninus Pius (138–161), he arrived in Rome and started his own school. Tatian was one of his pupils. In the reign of Marcus Aurelius, after disputing with the cynic philosopher Crescens, he was denounced by the latter to the authorities, according to Tatian (Address to the Greeks 19) and Eusebius (HE IV 16.7–8). Justin was tried, together with six friends (two of them, Euelpistus and Hierax, slaves educated by him), by the urban prefect Junius Rusticus, and was beheaded. Though the precise year of his death is uncertain, it can reasonably be dated by the prefectural term of Rusticus (who governed from 162 to 168). The Christian "Martyrdom of Justin" reports a record of the trial.

The Prefect Rusticus says: Approach and sacrifice, all of you, to the gods.
Justin says: No one in his right mind gives up piety for impiety.
The Prefect Rusticus says: If you do not obey, you will be tortured without mercy.
Justin replies: That is our desire, to be tortured for Our Lord, Jesus Christ, and so to be saved, for that will give us salvation and firm confidence at the more terrible universal tribunal of Our Lord and Saviour.
And all the martyrs said: Do as you wish; for we are Christians, and we do not sacrifice to idols.
The Prefect Rusticus read the sentence: Those who do not wish to sacrifice to the gods and to obey the emperor will be scourged and beheaded according to the laws.
The holy martyrs glorifying God betook themselves to the customary place, where they were beheaded and consummated their martyrdom confessing their Saviour.

== Writings ==
Iustini Philosophi et martyris Opera (1636)

The earliest mention of Justin is found in the Oratio ad Graecos by his student Tatian who, after calling him "the most admirable Justin", quotes a saying of his and says that the Cynic Crescens laid snares for him. Irenaeus speaks of Justin's martyrdom and of Tatian as his disciple. Irenaeus quotes Justin twice and shows his influence in other places. Tertullian, in his Adversus Valentinianos, calls Justin a philosopher and a martyr and the earliest antagonist of heretics. Hippolytus and Methodius of Olympus also mention or quote him. Eusebius of Caesarea deals with him at some length, and names the following works:

1. The First Apology, addressed to Antoninus Pius, his sons, and the Roman Senate;
2. A Second Apology of Justin Martyr, addressed to the Roman Senate;
3. The Discourse to the Greeks (thought now not to have been written by Justin), (Note: Because of its dependence on the later work of Justin's pupil, Tatian, it is probably by another writer, dated towards the end of the second century or the beginning of the third century AD.) a discussion with Greek philosophers on the character of their gods;
4. An Hortatory Address to the Greeks (Note: A pre-fourth-century anonymous work wrongly attributed to Justin Martyr.) (known now not to have been written by Justin);
5. A treatise On the Sovereignty of God, in which he makes use of pagan authorities as well as Christian;
6. A work entitled The Psalmist;
7. A treatise in scholastic form On the Soul; and
8. The Dialogue with Trypho.

Eusebius implies that other works were in circulation; from St Irenaeus he knows of the apology "Against Marcion," and from Justin's "Apology" of a "Refutation of all Heresies". St Epiphanius and St Jerome mention Justin.

Rufinus borrows from his Latin original of Hadrian's letter.

=== Spurious medieval works ===
After Rufinus, Justin was known mainly from St Irenaeus and Eusebius or from spurious works. A considerable number of other works are given as Justin's by Arethas of Caesarea, Photius of Constantinople, and other writers, but this attribution is now generally admitted to be spurious. The Expositio rectae fidei was assigned by Johann Dräseke to Apollinaris of Laodicea, but it is probably a work of as late as the 6th century. The Cohortatio ad Graecos has been attributed to Apollinaris of Laodicea, Apollinaris of Hierapolis, as well as others. The Epistola ad Zenam et Serenum, an exhortation to Christian living, is dependent upon Clement of Alexandria, and was assigned by Pierre Batiffol to the Novatian Bishop Sisinnius (c. 400). The extant work under the title "On the Sovereignty of God" does not correspond with Eusebius' description of it, though Adolf von Harnack regarded it as still possibly Justin's, and at least of the 2nd century. The author of the smaller treatise To the Greeks cannot be Justin, because he is dependent on Tatian; Von Harnack placed it between 180 and 240.

=== Parisinus graecus 450 ===
After this medieval period in which no authentic works of Justin Martyr were in widespread circulation, a single codex containing the complete works of Justin Martyr was discovered and purchased by Guillaume Pellicier, c. 1540 in Venice. Pellicier sent it to the Bibliothèque nationale de France where it remains today under the catalog number Parisinus graecus 450. This codex was completed on 11 September 1364 somewhere in the Byzantine Empire. The name of the scribe is unknown, although Manuel Kantakouzenos has been suggested as patron. Internal textual evidence shows that multiple older manuscripts were used to create this one, which strongly suggests that it must have originated in a major population center like Mistra, since libraries holding Justin Martyr were already rare by 1364. Other partial medieval manuscripts have been shown to be copies of this one. The editio princeps was published by Robert Estienne in 1551.

=== Dialogue with Trypho ===
The Dialogue is a later work than the First Apology; the date of composition of the latter, judging from the fact that it was addressed to Antoninus Pius and his adopted sons Marcus Aurelius and Lucius Verus, must fall between 147 and 161. In the Dialogue with Trypho, after an introductory section, Justin undertakes to show that Christianity is the new law for all men.

The Dialogue's central contention is that the Hebrew scriptures are the property of the Christians, because they alone grasp their true meaning – a comprehension that Jews, in Justin's view, lack entirely. This idea is already found earlier, though in a less developed form, in the Epistle of Barnabas, part of the New Testament apocrypha written around 130 AD. Justin's argument rests on three foundations: that Christ had replaced the Law of Moses, rendering Jewish observance obsolete; that the biblical prophecies find their fulfillment in Christ; and that the Christian community is the "new Israel", inheriting the status once held by the Jewish people.

The Dialogue is most frequently interpreted as a Christian polemic directed against Judaism. Some scholars also interpret as a significant intervention in intra-Christian debates. They point to Justin's frequent use of the Greek term hairesis (meaning "school of thought", and the origin of the word "heresy") as evidence of a developing concern with defining the borders of Christianity and opposing rival Christian groups, and as a foundational, or at least significant, milestone in the development of Christian heresiological discourse.

Justin's dialogue with Trypho is unique in that he provides information on tensions between Jewish and Gentile believers in Jesus of the second century (Dial. 47:2–3) and in acknowledging the existence of a range, and a variety, of attitudes toward the beliefs and traditions of the Jewish believers in Jesus.

=== On the Resurrection ===
The treatise On the Resurrection exists in extensive fragments that are preserved in the Sacra parallela. The fragments begin with the assertion that the truth, and God the author of truth, need no witness, but that as a concession to the weakness of men it is necessary to give arguments to convince those who gainsay it. It is then shown, after a denial of unfounded deductions, that the resurrection of the body is neither impossible nor unworthy of God, and that the evidence of prophecy is not lacking for it. Another fragment takes up the positive proof of the resurrection, adducing that of Christ and of those whom he recalled to life. In yet another fragment the resurrection is shown to be that of what has gone down, i.e., the body; the knowledge concerning it is the new doctrine, in contrast to that of the old philosophers. The doctrine follows from the command to keep the body in moral purity.

The authenticity of the treatise is not so generally accepted as are Justin's other works. Even so, earlier than the Sacra parallela, it is referred to by Procopius of Gaza (c. 465–528). Methodius appeals to Justin in support of his interpretation of 1 Corinthians 15:50 in a way that makes it natural to assume the existence of a treatise on the subject, to say nothing of other traces of a connection in thought both here in Irenaeus (V., ii.-xiii. 5) and in Tertullian, where it is too close to be anything but a conscious following of the Greek. The Against Marcion is lost, as is the Refutation of all Heresies to which Justin himself refers in Apology, i. 26; Hegesippus, besides perhaps Irenaeus and Tertullian, seems to have used it.

== Role within the Church ==
Flacius discovered "blemishes" in Justin's theology, which he attributed to the influence of pagan philosophers; and in modern times Semler and S.G. Lange have made him out a thorough Hellene, while Semisch and Otto defend him from this charge.

In opposition to the school of Ferdinand Christian Baur, who considered him a Jewish Christian, Albrecht Ritschl has argued that it was precisely because he was a Gentile Christian that he did not fully understand the Old Testament foundation of Paul's teaching, and explained in this way the modified character of his Paulinism and his legal mode of thought.

Engelhardt has attempted to extend this line of treatment to Justin's entire theology, and to show that his conceptions of God, of free will and righteousness, of redemption, grace, and merit prove the influence of the cultivated Greek pagan world of the 2nd century, dominated by the Platonic and Stoic philosophy. But he admits that Justin is a Christian in his unquestioning adherence to the Church and its faith, his unqualified recognition of the Old Testament, and his faith in Christ as the Son of God the Creator, made manifest in the flesh, crucified, and risen, through which belief he succeeds in getting away from the dualism of both pagan and Gnostic philosophy.

Justin was confident that his teaching was that of the Church at large. He knows of a division among the orthodox only on the question of the millennium and on the attitude toward the milder Jewish Christianity, which he personally is willing to tolerate as long as its professors in their turn do not interfere with the liberty of the Gentile converts; his millenarianism seems to have no connection with Judaism, but he believes firmly in a millennium, and generally in the Christian eschatology.

Opposition to Judaism was common among church leaders in his day; however, Justin Martyr was hostile towards Jewry and regarded Jews as an accursed people. His anti-Judaic polemics have been cited as an origin of Christian antisemitism. However his views elaborated in the Dialogue with Trypho were tame compared to those of John Chrysostom and others.

== Christology ==
Justin, like others, thought that the Greek philosophers had derived, if not borrowed, the most essential elements of truth found in their teaching from the Old Testament. But at the same time he adopted the Stoic doctrine of the "seminal word," and so philosophy was to him an operation of the Word—in fact, through his identification of the Word with Christ, it was brought into immediate connection with him. In more recent scholarship, his writings are seen as expressing a knowledge and utilization of Platonism while also being critical of it, mentioning Plato's corpus numerous times in his work. Even when later converting to Christianity, he maintained Platonic viewpoints of divinity.

Thus he does not hesitate to declare that Socrates and Heraclitus were Christians (Apol., i. 46, ii. 10). His aim was to emphasize the absolute significance of Christ, so that all that ever existed of virtue and truth may be referred to him. The old philosophers and law-givers had only a part of the Logos, while the whole appears in Christ.

While the gentile peoples, seduced by devils, had deserted the true God for idols, the Jews and Samaritans possessed the revelation given through the prophets and awaited the Messiah. However, the law, while containing commandments intended to promote the true fear of God, had other prescriptions of a purely pedagogic nature, which necessarily ceased when Christ, their end, appeared; of such temporary and merely relative regulations were circumcision, animal sacrifices, the Sabbath, and the laws as to food. Through Christ, the abiding law of God has been fully proclaimed. In his character, as the teacher of the new doctrine and promulgator of the new law, lies the essential nature of his redeeming work.

The idea of an economy of grace, of a restoration of the union with God which had been destroyed by sin, is not foreign to him. It is noteworthy that in the "Dialogue" he no longer speaks of a "seed of the Word" in every man, and in his non-apologetic works the emphasis is laid upon the redeeming acts of the life of Christ rather than upon the demonstration of the reasonableness and moral value of Christianity, though the fragmentary character of the latter works make it difficult to determine exactly to what extent this is true and how far the teaching of Irenaeus on redemption is derived from him.

The 1913 Catholic Encyclopedia notes that scholars have differed on whether Justin's writings on the nature of God were meant to express his firm opinion on points of doctrine, or to speculate on these matters. Specific points Justin addressed include that the Logos is "numerically distinct from the Father" though "born of the very substance of the Father," and that "through the Word, God has made everything." Justin used the metaphor of fire to describe the Logos as spreading like a flame, rather than "dividing" the substance of the Father. He also defended the Holy Spirit as a member of the Trinity, as well as the virginal birth of Jesus Christ. The Encyclopedia states that Justin places the genesis of the Logos as a voluntary act of the Father at the beginning of creation, noting that this is an "unfortunate" conflict with later Christian teachings.

The Word is numerically distinct from the Father (Dial., cxxviii, cxxix; cf. lvi, lxii). He was born of the very substance of the Father, not that this substance was divided, but He proceeds from it as one fire does from another at which it is lit (cxxviii, lxi); this form of production (procession) is compared also with that of human speech (lxi). The Word (Logos) is therefore the Son: much more, He alone may properly be called Son (II Apol., vi, 3); He is the monogenes, the unigenitus (Dial., cv). Elsewhere, however, Justin, like St. Paul, calls Him the eldest Son, prototokos (I Apol., xxxiii; xlvi; lxiii; Dial., lxxxiv, lxxxv, cxxv). The Word is God (I Apol., lxiii; Dial., xxxiv, xxxvi, xxxvii, lvi, lxiii, lxxvi, lxxxvi, lxxxvii, cxiii, cxv, cxxv, cxxvi, cxviii). His Divinity, however, seems subordinate, as does the worship which is rendered to Him (I Apol., vi; cf. lxi, 13; Teder, "Justins des Märtyrers Lehre von Jesus Christus", Freiburg im Br., 1906, 103–19). The Father engendered Him by a free and voluntary act (Dial., lxi, c, cxxvii, cxxviii; cf. Teder, op. cit., 104), at the beginning of all His works (Dial., lxi, lxii, II Apol., vi, 3); in this last text certain authors thought they distinguished in the Word two states of being, one intimate, the other outspoken, but this distinction, though found in some other apologists, is in Justin very doubtful. Through the Word God has made everything (II Apol., vi; Dial., cxiv). The Word is diffused through all humanity (I Apol., vi; II, viii; xiii); it was He who appeared to the patriarchs (I Apol., lxii; lxiii; Dial., lvi, lix, lx etc.). Two influences are plainly discernible in the aforesaid body of doctrine. It is, of course, to Christian revelation that Justin owes his concept of the distinct personality of the Word, His Divinity and Incarnation; but philosophic speculation is responsible for his unfortunate concepts of the temporal and voluntary generation of the Word, and for the subordinationism of Justin's theology. It must be recognized, moreover, that the latter ideas stand out more boldly in the "Apology" than in the "Dialogue."

== Memoirs of the apostles ==
Justin Martyr, in his First Apology (c. 155) and Dialogue with Trypho (c. 160), sometimes refers to written sources consisting of narratives of the life of Jesus and quotations of the sayings of Jesus as "memoirs of the apostles" (Greek: ἀπομνημονεύματα τῶν ἀποστόλων, romanized: apomnêmoneúmata tôn apostólôn) and less frequently as gospels (Greek: εὐαγγέλιον, romanized: euangélion) which, Justin says, were read every Sunday in the church at Rome (1 Apol. 67.3 – "and the memoirs of the apostles or the writings of the prophets are being read as long as it is allowable").

The designation "memoirs of the apostles" occurs twice in Justin's First Apology (66.3, 67.3–4) and thirteen times in the Dialogue, mostly in his interpretation of Psalm 22, whereas the term "gospel" is used only three times, once in 1 Apol. 66.3 and twice in the Dialogue. The single passage where Justin uses both terms (1 Apol. 66.3) makes it clear that "memoirs of the apostles" and "gospels" are equivalent, and the use of the plural indicates Justin's awareness of more than one written gospel. ("The apostles in the memoirs which have come from them, which are also called gospels, have transmitted that the Lord had commanded..."). Justin may have preferred the designation "memoirs of the apostles" as a contrast to the "gospel" of his contemporary Marcion to emphasize the connections between the historical testimony of the gospels and the Old Testament prophecies which Marcion rejected.

The origin of Justin's use of the name "memoirs of the apostles" as a synonym for the gospels is uncertain. Scholar David E. Aune has argued that the gospels were modeled after classical Greco-Roman biographies, and Justin's use of the term apomnemoneumata to mean all the Synoptic Gospels should be understood as referring to a written biography such as the Memorabilia of Xenophon because they preserve the authentic teachings of Jesus. However, scholar Helmut Koester has pointed out the Latin title "Memorabilia" was not applied to Xenophon's work until the Middle Ages, and it is more likely apomnemoneumata was used to describe the oral transmission of the sayings of Jesus in early Christianity. Papias uses a similar term meaning "remembered" (apomnemoneusen) when describing how Mark "accurately recorded the recollections of Peter", and Justin also uses it in reference to Peter in Dial. 106.3, followed by a quotation found only in the Gospel of Mark (Mk 3:16–17). Therefore, according to Koester, it is likely that Justin applied the name "memoirs of the apostles" analogously to indicate the trustworthy recollections of the apostles found in the written record of the gospels.

Justin expounded on the gospel texts as an accurate recording of the fulfillment of prophecy, which he combined with quotations of the prophets of Israel from the LXX to demonstrate a proof from prophecy of the Christian kerygma. The importance which Justin attaches to the words of the prophets, which he regularly quotes with the formula "it is written", shows his estimate of the Old Testament Scriptures. However, the scriptural authority he attributes to the "memoirs of the apostles" is less certain. Koester articulates a majority view among scholars that Justin considered the "memoirs of the apostles" to be accurate historical records but not inspired writings, whereas scholar Charles E. Hill, though acknowledging the position of mainstream scholarship, contends that Justin regarded the fulfillment quotations of the gospels to be equal in authority.

== Composition ==
=== Scriptural sources ===
==== Gospels ====
Justin uses material from the Synoptic Gospels (Matthew, Mark, and Luke) in the composition of the First Apology and the Dialogue, either directly, as in the case of Matthew, or indirectly through the use of a gospel harmony, which may have been composed by Justin or his school. However, his use, or even knowledge, of the Gospel of John is uncertain. One possible reference to John is a saying that is quoted in the context of a description of Christian baptism (1 Apol. 61.4 – "Unless you are reborn, you cannot enter into the kingdom of heaven."). However, Koester contends that Justin obtained this saying from a baptismal liturgy rather than a written gospel. Charles Hill and James Barker argue Justin was aware of the Gospel of John. Justin's possible knowledge of John's gospel may be suggested by verbal similarities to John 3:4 directly after the discussion about the new birth ("Now, that it is impossible for those who have once been born to enter their mother's womb is manifest to all"). Justin also uses language very similar to that of John 1:20 and 1:28. Furthermore, by employing the term "memoirs of the apostles" and distinguishing them from the writings of their "followers", Justin must have been of the belief that at least two gospels were written by actual apostles.

==== Apocalypse ====
Justin does not quote from the Book of Revelation directly, yet he clearly refers to it, naming John as its author (Dial. 81.4 "Moreover also among us a man named John, one of the apostles of Christ, prophesied in a revelation made to him that those who have believed on our Christ will spend a thousand years in Jerusalem; and that hereafter the general and, in short, the eternal resurrection and judgment of all will likewise take place"). Scholar Brooke Foss Westcott notes that this reference to the author of the single prophetic book of the New Testament illustrates the distinction Justin made between the role of prophecy and fulfillment quotations from the gospels, as Justin does not mention any of the individual canonical gospels by name.

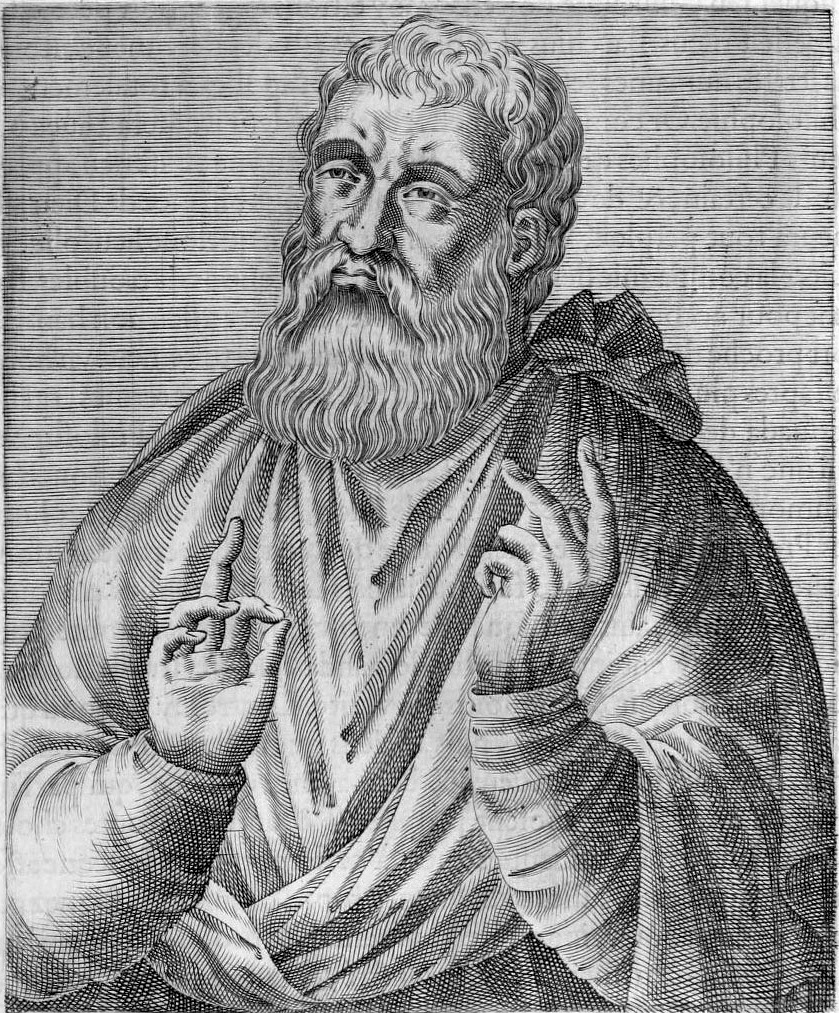
16th century engraving of Justin

==== Letters ====
The apologetic character of Justin's habit of thought appears again in the Acts of his martyrdom, the genuineness of which is attested by internal evidence.

=== Testimony sources ===
According to scholar Oskar Skarsaune, Justin relies on two main sources for his proofs from prophecy that probably circulated as collections of scriptural testimonies within his Christian school. He refers to Justin's primary source for demonstrating scriptural proofs in the First Apology and parallel passages in the Dialogue as a "kerygma source". A second source, which was used only in the Dialogue, may be identical to a lost dialogue attributed to Aristo of Pella on the divine nature of the Messiah, the Dialogue of Jason and Papiscus (c. 140). Justin brings in biblical quotes verbatim from these sources, and he often appears to be paraphrasing his sources very closely, even in his interpretive remarks.

Justin occasionally uses the Gospel of Matthew directly as a source for Old Testament prophecies to supplement his testimony sources. However, the fulfillment quotations from these sources most often appear to be harmonizations of the gospels of Matthew and Luke. Koester suggests that Justin had composed an early harmony along the lines of his pupil Tatian's Diatesseron. However, the existence of a harmony independent of a collection of sayings for exposition purposes has been disputed by scholar Arthur Bellinzoni. The question of whether the harmonized gospel materials found in Justin's writings came from a preexisting gospel harmony or were assembled as part of an integral process of creating scriptural prooftexts is an ongoing subject of scholarly investigation.

==== "Kerygma source" ====
The following excerpt from 1 Apol. 33:1,4–5 (partial parallel in Dial. 84) on the annunciation and virgin birth of Jesus shows how Justin used harmonized gospel verses from Matthew and Luke to provide a scriptural proof of the messiahship of Jesus based on fulfillment of the prophecy of Isaiah 7:14.

And hear again how Isaiah in express words foretold that He should be born of a virgin; for he spoke thus: 'Behold, the virgin will conceive in the womb and bear a son, and they will say in his name, God with us' (Mt 1:23).

— 1 Apol. 33:1

...the power of God, coming down upon the virgin, overshadowed her and made her while yet a virgin to conceive (cf. Lk 1:35), and the angel of God proclaimed to her and said, 'Behold, you will conceive in the womb from the Holy Spirit and bear a son (Mt 1:20/Lk 1:31) and he will be called Son of the Most High (Lk 1:32). And you shall call his name Jesus, because he will save his people from their sins (Mt 1:21),' as those who have made memoirs of all things about our savior Jesus Christ taught...

— 1 Apol. 33:4–5

According to Skarsaune, the harmonized gospel narratives of Matthew and Luke were part of a tradition already circulating within Justin's school that expounded on the life and work of Jesus as the Messiah and the apostolic mission. Justin then rearranged and expanded these testimonia to create his First Apology. The "kerygma source" of prooftexts (contained within 1 Apol. 31–53) is believed to have had a Two Parousias Christology, characterized by the belief that Jesus first came in humility, in fulfillment of prophecy, and will return in glory as the Messiah to the Gentiles. There are close literary parallels between the Christology of Justin's source and the Apocalypse of Peter.

==== Dialogue of Jason and Papiscus ====
The following excerpts from the Dialogue with Trypho of the baptism (Dial. 88:3,8) and temptation (Dial. 103:5–6) of Jesus, which are believed to have originated from the Dialogue of Jason and Papiscus, illustrate the use of gospel narratives and sayings of Jesus in a testimony source and how Justin has adopted these "memoirs of the apostles" for his own purposes.

And then, when Jesus had come to the river Jordan where John was baptizing, and when Jesus came down into the water, a fire was even kindled in the Jordan, and when He was rising up from the water, the Holy Spirit fluttered down upon Him in the form of a dove, as the apostles have written about this very Christ of ours.

— Dial. 88:3

And when Jesus came to the Jordan, and being supposed to be the son of Joseph the carpenter..., the Holy Spirit, and for man's sake, as I said before, fluttered down upon Him, and a voice came at the time out of the heavens – which was spoken also by David, when he said, impersonating Christ, what the Father was going to say to Him – 'You are My Son, this day I have begotten you'."

— Dial. 88:8

...the Devil himself,...[was] called serpent by Moses, the Devil by Job and Zachariah, and was addressed as Satanas by Jesus. This indicated that he had a compound name made up of the actions which he performed; for the word "Sata" in the Hebrew and Syrian tongue means "apostate", while "nas" is the word which means in translation "serpent", thus, from both parts is formed the one word "Sata-nas". It is narrated in the memoirs of the apostles that as soon as Jesus came up out of the river Jordan and a voice said to him: 'You are My Son, this day I have begotten you', this Devil came and tempted him, even so far as to exclaim: 'Worship me'; but Christ replied: 'Get behind me, Satanas, the Lord your God shall you worship, and Him only shall you serve'. For, since the Devil had deceived Adam, he fancied that he could in some way harm him also.

— Dial. 103:5–6

The quotations refer to the fulfillment of a prophecy of Psalm 2:7 found in the Western text-type of Luke 3:22. Justin's mention of the fire on the Jordan without comment suggests that he was relying on an intermediate source for these gospel quotations, and his literal interpretation of a pseudo-etymology of the Hebrew word Satan indicates a dependence on a testimony source with a knowledge of Hebrew, which was probably the Dialogue of Jason and Papiscus.

The Dialogue attributed to Aristo of Pella is believed to have furnished Justin with scriptural prooftexts on the divinity of the Messiah by combining a Wisdom Christology – Christ as the incarnation of preexistent Wisdom – with a Second Adam Christology – the first Adam was conquered by Satan, but this Fall of Man is reversed by Christ as the Second Adam who conquers Satan. This is implied in the pseudo-etymology in Dial. 103:5–6 linking the name of Satan to the "apostate-serpent". The Christology of the source is close to that of the Ascension of Isaiah.

=== Catechetical sources ===
Justin quotes many sayings of Jesus in 1 Apol. 15–17 and smaller sayings clusters in Dial. 17:3–4; 35:3; 51:2–3; and 76:4–7. The sayings are most often harmonizations of Matthew and Luke that appear to be grouped together topically and organized into sayings collections, including material that probably originated from an early Christian catechism.

The following example of an ethical teaching On Swearing Oaths in 1 Apol. 16:5 shows a combination of sayings material found in Matthew and the Epistle of James:

Do not swear at all (Mt 5:34). Let your Yes be Yes and your No be No (Jas 5:12). Everything beyond these is from evil (Mt 5:37).

The saying "Let your Yes be Yes and your No be No" from James 5:12 is interpolated into a sayings complex from Matthew 5:34,37. The text appears in a large number of Patristic quotations and twice in the Clementine Homilies (Hom. 3:55, 19:2). Thus, it is likely that Justin was quoting this harmonized text from a catechism.

The harmonization of Matthew and Luke is evident in the following quotations of Mt 7:22–23 and Lk 13:26–27, which are used by Justin twice, in 1 Apol. 16:11 and Dial. 76:5:

Many will say to me, 'Lord, Lord, did we not in your name eat and drink and do powerful deeds?' And then I shall say to them, 'go away from me, workers of lawlessness'.

Many will say to me on that day, 'Lord, Lord, did we not in your name eat and drink and prophecy and drive out demons?' And I shall say to them, 'go away from me'.

In both cases, Justin is using the same harmonized text of Matthew and Luke, although neither of the quotations includes the entire text of those gospel passages. The last phrase, "workers of lawlessness", has an exact parallel with 2 Clement 4:5. This harmonized text also appears in a large number of quotations by the Church Fathers. 1 Apol. 16:11 is part of a larger unit of sayings material in 1 Apol 16:9–13 which combines a warning against being unprepared with a warning against false prophets. The entire unit is a carefully composed harmony of parallel texts from Matthew and Luke. This unit is part of a larger collection of sayings found in 1 Apol. 15–17 that appear to have originated from a catechism used by Justin's school in Rome, which may have had a wide circulation. Justin excerpted and rearranged the catechetical sayings material to create Apol. 15–17 and parallel passages in the Dialogue.

=== Other sources ===
Justin includes a tract on Greek mythology in 1 Apol. 54 and Dial. 69 which asserts that myths about various pagan deities are imitations of the prophecies about Christ in the Old Testament. There is also a small tract in 1 Apol. 59–60 on borrowings of the philosophers from Moses, particularly Plato. These two tracts may be from the same source, which may have been an early Christian Apology.

== Prophetic exegesis ==
Justin's writings constitute a storehouse of early interpretation of the prophetic Scriptures.

=== Belief in prophecy ===
The truth of the prophets, he declares, compels assent. He considered the Old Testament an inspired guide and counselor. He was converted by a Christian philosopher whom he paraphrased as saying:

"There existed, long before this time, certain men more ancient than all those who are esteemed philosophers, both righteous and beloved by God, who spoke by the Divine Spirit, and foretold events which would take place, and which are now taking place. They are called prophets. These alone both saw and announced the truth to men, neither reverencing nor fearing any man, not influenced by a desire for glory, but speaking those things alone which they saw and which they heard, being filled with the Holy Spirit. Their writings are still extant, and he who has read them is very much helped in his knowledge of the beginning and end of things. . . And those events which have happened, and those which are happening, compel you to assent to the utterances made by them."

Then Justin told his own experience:

"Straightway a flame was kindled in my soul; and a love of the prophets, and of those men who are friends of Christ, possessed me; and whilst revolving his words in my mind, I found this philosophy alone to be safe and profitable."

=== Fulfillment ===
Justin listed the following events as fulfillments of Bible prophecy:

- The prophecies concerning the Messiah, and the particulars of His life.
- The destruction of Jerusalem.
- The Gentiles accepting Christianity.
- Isaiah predicted that Jesus would be born of a virgin.
- Micah mentions Bethlehem as the place of His birth.
- Zechariah forecasts His entry into Jerusalem on the foal of an ass (a donkey).

=== Second Advent and Daniel 7 ===
Justin connected the Second Advent with the climax of the prophecy of Daniel 7:

"But if so great a power is shown to have followed and to be still following the dispensation of His suffering, how great shall that be which shall follow His glorious advent! For He shall come on the clouds as the Son of man, so Daniel foretold, and His angels shall come with Him. [Then follows Dan. 7:9–28.]"

=== Man of apostasy ===
Justin, as Paul in 2 Thessalonians, placed the second advent of Jesus close upon the heels of the appearance of the "man of apostasy" [Greek: τῆς ἀποστασίας ἄνθρωπος, from 2 Thessalonians 2:3].

=== Time, times, and a half ===
Daniel's "time, times, and a half", Justin believed, was nearing its consummation, when the Antichrist would speak his blasphemies against the Most High.

=== Eucharist ===
Justin's statements are some of the earliest Christian expressions on the Eucharist.

"And this food is called among us Εὐχαριστία [the Eucharist] ... For not as common bread and common drink do we receive these; but in like manner as Jesus Christ our Saviour, having been made flesh by the Word of God, had both flesh and blood for our salvation, so likewise have we been taught that the food which is blessed by the prayer of His word, and from which our blood and flesh by transmutation are nourished, is the flesh and blood of that Jesus who was made flesh."

== Veneration ==
=== Relics ===
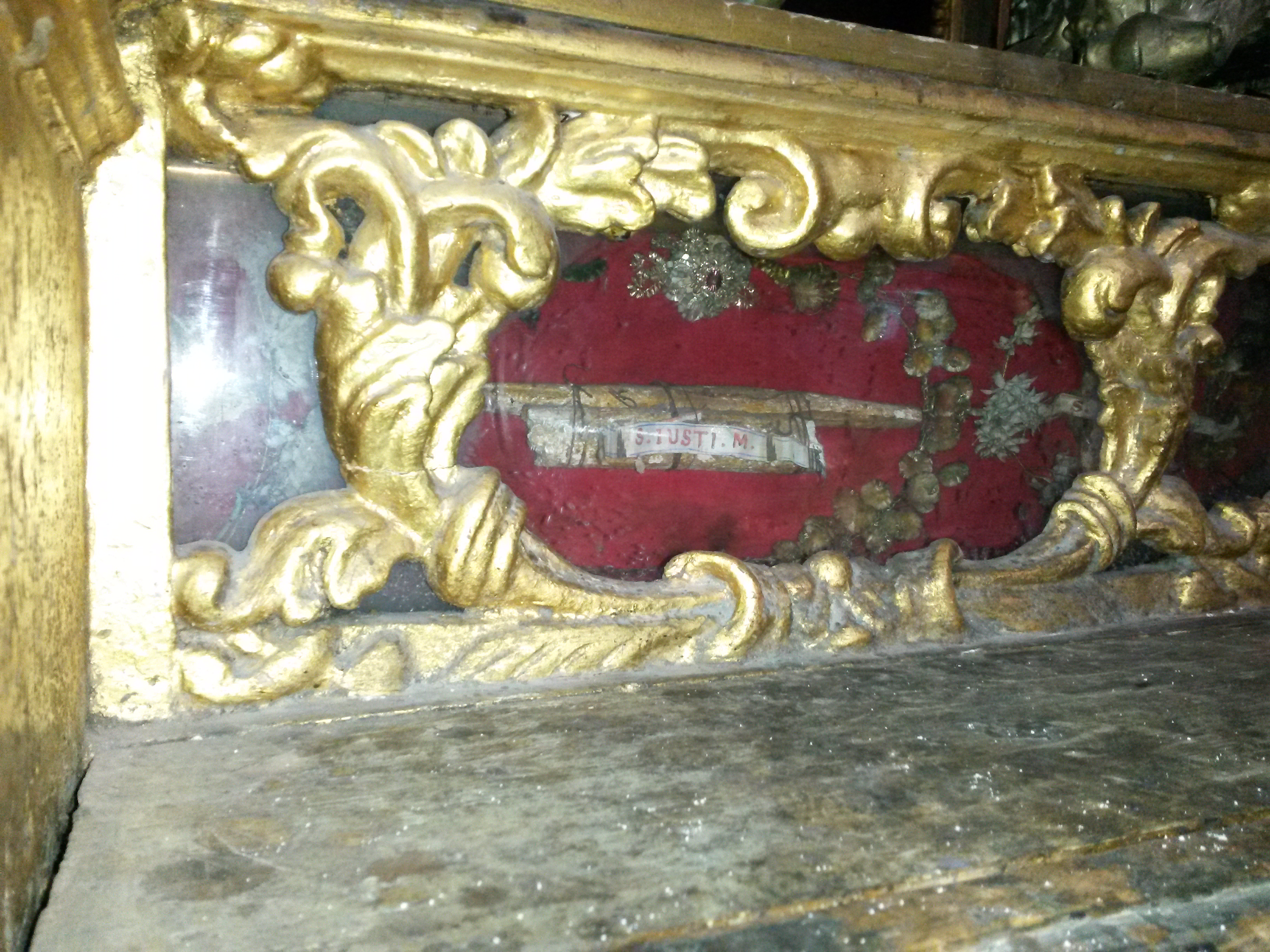
Relics of St. Justin and other early Church martyrs can be found in the lateral altar dedicated to St. Anne and St. Joachim at the Jesuit's Church in Valletta, Malta.

The church of St. John the Baptist in Sacrofano, a few miles north of Rome, claims to have his relics.

Another large reliquary holds a large piece of his bones at a private chapel in Malta that was originally brought from France from a private collection. The reliquary is sealed by a bishop from the 19th century and with saint Justin's bone there are saint Liberata and saint Innocent Martyrs.

A case is also made that the relics of St. Justin are buried in Annapolis, Maryland. During a period of unrest in Italy, a noble family said to be in possession of his remains sent them in 1873 to a priest in Baltimore for safekeeping. They were displayed in St. Mary's Church for a period of time before they were again locked away for safekeeping. The remains were rediscovered and given a proper burial at St. Mary's, with Vatican approval, in 1989. It is now asserted that the bones were of St. Justin of the third century who was martyred during the persecution of Maximus.

=== Feast day ===
In 1882, Pope Leo XIII had a Mass and an Office composed for his feast day, which he set at 14 April, one day after the date of his death as indicated in the Martyrology of Florus; but since this date quite often falls within the main Paschal celebrations, the feast was moved in 1968 to 1 June, the date on which he has been celebrated in the Byzantine Rite since at least the 9th century.

Justin is remembered in the Church of England with a Lesser Festival on 1 June.

== See also ==
- Epistle to Diognetus
- List of early Christian saints
- Saint Justin Martyr, patron saint archive

== Editions ==
Greek texts:

- P.Oxy.5129 (Egyptian Exploration Society, 4th century)
- Thirlby, S., London, 1722.
- Maran, P., Paris, 1742 (the Benedictine edition, reprinted in Migne, Patrologia Graeca, Vol. VI. Paris, 1857).
- Otto, J. C., Jena, 1842 (3d ed., 1876–1881).
- Krüger, G., Leipzig, 1896 (3d ed., Tübingen, 1915).
- In Die ältesten Apologeten, ed. G.J. Goodspeed, (Göttingen, 1914; reprint 1984).
- Iustini Martyris Dialogus cum Tryphone, ed Miroslav Marcovich (Patristische Texte und Studien 47, Berlin/New York: de Gruyter, 1997).
- Minns, Denis, and Paul Parvis. Justin, Philosopher and Martyr: Apologies. Edited by Henry Chadwick, Oxford Early Christian Texts. Oxford: OUP, 2009 (In addition to translating into English has a critical Greek text).
- Philippe Bobichon (ed.), Justin Martyr, Dialogue avec Tryphon, édition critique, introduction, texte grec, traduction, commentaires, appendices, indices, (Coll. Paradosis nos. 47, vol. I-II.) Editions Universitaires de Fribourg Suisse, 2003 online

English translations:

- Halton, TP and M Slusser, eds, Dialogue with Trypho, trans TB Falls, Selections from the Fathers of the Church, 3, (Washington, DC: Catholic University of America Press)
- Minns, Denis, & Paul Parvis. Justin, Philosopher and Martyr: Apologies. Edited by Henry Chadwick, Oxford Early Christian Texts. Oxford: OUP, 2009.

Georgian translation:

- "Sulieri Venakhi", I, The First and Second Apology of Saint Justin Philosopher and Martyr, translated from Old Greek into Georgian, submitted with preface and comments by a monk Ekvtime Krupitski, Tbilisi Theological Academy, Tsalka, Sameba village, Cross Monastery, "Sulieri venakhi" Publishers, Tbilisi, 2022, ISBN 978-9941-9676-1-0.
- "Sulieri Venakhi", II, Saint Justin Martyr's dialogue with Trypho the Jew, translated from Old Greek into Georgian, submitted with preface and comments by a monk Ekvtime Krupitski, Tbilisi Theological Academy, Tsalka, Sameba village, Cross Monastery, "Sulieri venakhi" Publishers, Tbilisi, 2019, ISBN 978-9941-8-1570-6.

Commentaries

- Ulrich, Jörg (2019). Justin, Apologien. Kommentar zu frühchristlichen Apologeten, volume 4/5. Freiburg: Herder, ISBN 978-3-451-29043-5.

== Literary references ==
- The Rector of Justin (1964), perhaps Louis Auchincloss's best-regarded novel, is the tale of a renowned headmaster of a New England prep school—similar to Groton—and how he came to found his institution. He chooses the name Justin Martyr for his Episcopal school. ("The school was named for the early martyr and scholar who tried to reconcile the thinking of the Greek philosophers with the doctrines of Christ. Not for Prescott [the headmaster] were the humble fishermen who had their faith and faith alone.")
- Historian Mauro Martone, in his supernatural legal thriller - "The Orcadian File" (2021), has depicted a detailed fictionalised version of Justin's trial.

== Literature ==
- Aune, David E. (1987). The New Testament in its Literary Environment. Westminster John Knox Press. ISBN 978-0-664-21912-3.
- Bellinzoni, Arthur J. (1967). The Sayings of Jesus in the Writings of Justin Martyr. Brill. ASIN B0007ISJW6.
- Philippe Bobichon, « Comment Justin a-t-il acquis sa connaissance exceptionnelle des exégèses juives (contenus et méthodes) ? », Revue de Théologie et de Philosophie, 139, 2007, pp. 101–126 1
- Philippe Bobichon, « Persécutions, calomnies, ‘birkat ha-Minim’, et émissaires juifs de propagande antichrétienne dans le Dialogue avec Tryphon de Justin Martyr », Revue des Études Juives 162 /3-4 (juillet-décembre 2003), pp. 403-419.article online
- Philippe Bobichon, « Composite Citations and Textual Composition in Justin Martyr » in S. A. Adams and S. M. Ehorn (dir.), Composite Citations in Antiquity: Volume 1: Jewish, Graeco-Roman, and Early Christian Uses, Bloomsbury, 2015, pp. 158-181.text
- Philippe Bobichon, "Justin Martyr : étude stylistique du Dialogue avec Tryphon suivie d’une comparaison avec l’Apologie et le De resurrectione", Recherches augustiniennes et patristiques 34 (2005), pp. 1–61 online
- Hill, Charles E. (2004). The Johannine Corpus in the Early Church. Oxford University Press. ISBN 978-0-19-926458-2.
- Koester, Helmut (1956). "Septuaginta und Synoptischer Erzählungsstoff im Schriftbeweis Justins des Märtyrers". Theol. Habilitationsschrift. Heidelberg.
- Koester, Helmut (1990). Ancient Christian Gospels: Their History and Development. SCM/Trinity Press. ISBN 978-0-334-02459-0. "ancient christian gospels their history and development."
- Koester, Helmut (2000). Introduction to the New Testament: History and literature of Early Christianity (2 ed.). Walter de Gruyter, Berlin. ISBN 3-11-014693-2.
- Rokeah, David (2002). Justin Martyr and the Jews. Brill. ISBN 90-04-12310-5.
- Skarsaune, Oskar (1987). The Proof From Prophecy: A Study in Justin Martyr's Proof Text Tradition. Brill. ISBN 90-04-07468-6.
- Skarsaune, Oskar (2007). Jewish Believers in Jesus. Hendrickson Publishers. ISBN 978-1-56563-763-4.
- Westcott, Brooke Foss (1875). A general survey of the canon of the New Testament (4 ed.). MacMillan & Co. ASIN B00086L640.
- Bonwetsch, N. (1914). New Schaff-Herzog Encyclopedia of Religious Knowledge (3 ed.). Samuel Macauley Jackson ed., Baker Book House, Grand Rapids, MI. pp. 282–285. (a text that has entered the public domain and is available online at New Schaff-Herzog Encyclopedia of Religious Knowledge).
- Velikov, Yuliyan. Knowledge, Reciprocity and Philosophy in the Early Church Fathers. Aristides, St. Justin Martyr (and Philosopher) and Athenagoras. (2019); ISBN 978-954-337-377-2 (in Bulgarian)
