= Exhortation to the Greeks =

Ancient Greek Christian text

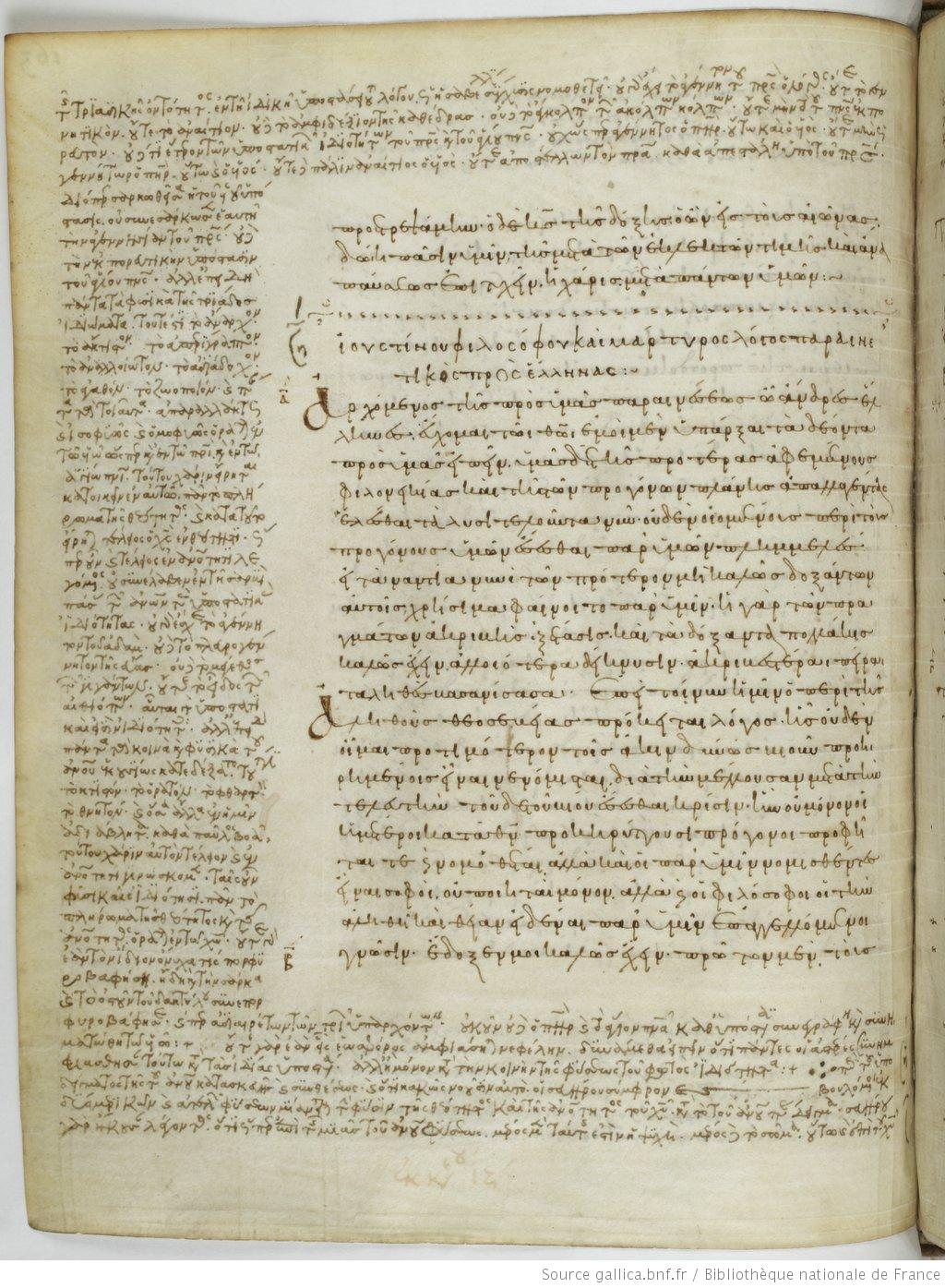
First page of the Exhortation to the Greeks, from the Arethas Codex (Paris grec 451). The script is Greek minuscule.

The Exhortation to the Greeks (Latin: Cohortatio ad Graecos; alternative Latin: Cohortatio ad Gentiles; Ancient Greek: Λόγος παραινέτικος πρὸς Ἕλληνας) is an Ancient Greek Christian paraenetic or protreptic text in thirty-eight chapters.

== Author and date ==
Although the work is anonymous, it was wrongly ascribed to, and included in collections of the works of, Justin Martyr. "Pseudo-Justin" became the current name when it was recognized that this author and Justin Martyr had significantly differing writing styles. Another difference is that the author of Exhortation to the Greeks, while nonetheless using Hellenistic period writers, rejects Greek thought, but Justin Martyr accepted the aspects of Greek philosophy which he felt were not in conflict with the gospels.

By way of phraseological and formal comparison Riedweg argues compellingly that Pseudo-Justin is to be identified with Marcellus of Ancyra. Among previous commentators there was no consensus concerning the exact dating, but Schreckenberg, Buitenwerf, and Hardwick agreed that the work was probably from the 4th century, which is in line with the biographical data of Marcellus of Ancyra. The work must not be confounded with Pseudo-Justin's Oratio ad Graecos or Oratio ad Gentiles, another writing erroneously transmitted under the name of Justin Martyr.

== Content ==
Pseudo-Justin identifies Homer as the main source for the theological views of pagans, views which he criticizes. The theories of the pagan Greek thinkers, the author claims, share in this false Homeric heritage. Pseudo-Justin instead offers up Moses as the source of proper theological views. He claims that Moses was more ancient—and thus, more authoritative—than Homer or any other pagan writer. He also claims that many of the good ideas which pagan philosophers had were taken from Moses, including claiming that Plato read Moses and the Nevi'im. Although this assertion is questioned by some recent authors, many philosophers like Aristobulus argued even before the time of Christ that the essentials of Greek philosophy and metaphysics were derived from Jewish sources. In the 2nd century Platonic philosopher Numenius of Apamea echoed this position in his well-known statement "What is Plato but Moses speaking Attic Greek?"

Pseudo-Justin starts his analysis of the pagan thinkers by looking at the teachings of the Milesian school, including Thales, Anaximander, and Anaximenes of Miletus. Together with the Milesians he adds Heraclitus, Hippasus, Anaxagoras, and Archelaus. He briefly mentions their various theories of "principle[s]" or "first cause[s]" (see arche); for example, Thales' theory that all matter comes from water. Next he mentions the theories of Pythagoras, Epicurus, and Empedocles. He concludes that all these Pre-Socratic philosophers and Epicurus (who was not Pre-Socratic) could not agree, and that this lack of agreement shows the weakness of their philosophy altogether. Heraclitus is listed as coming from the same city as Hippasus—Metapontum—although he in fact came from Ephesus.

Next he considers Plato and Aristotle. Despite these two being the most well-regarded of the pagan philosophers, Pseudo-Justin concludes similarly as before: They widely do not agree with each other and are to be criticized for as much. For example, he says that Plato teaches that the human soul has three parts (see Plato's tripartite theory of soul), while Aristotle teaches that the human soul has only one, reasoning aspect (see On the Soul). He also maintains that they contradict themselves as well. For example, he claims that Plato says at one time that there are three first causes, but then at another time that there are four. Again, he claims that Plato says that matter is uncreated, but then later contradicts himself and says that it is created. The modern scholarly views on the relationship between Plato's and Aristotle's philosophies are varied and complex.

In contrast with the disagreements between all the pagan philosophers, Pseudo-Justin commends the Christian teachers, who, he says, did not "contradict or argue with one another. Instead, without strife or quarrel, they passed on to us the knowledge they had received from God." He includes Moses as the oldest Christian teacher, although Christianity is normally understood as beginning after the life of Jesus. Many scholars have identified the text as Jewish in nature, on the basis of Pseudo-Justin's strong debt to Jewish thought. Another theory is that it is a particularly superficial reworking of Jewish material for Christian purposes (see split of early Christianity and Judaism).

Pseudo-Justin also quotes and discusses some Sibylline oracles. He writes that some of these oracles teach the true religion, including monotheism. Pseudo-Justin's quotations and commentary are an important textual source for these oracles.

== Editions ==
There is an edition by Miroslav Marcovich including the text in the original Greek, and a summary and notes in English, published by De Gruyter in 1990. A newer edition by Christoph Riedweg includes the Greek text along with a critical apparatus, and a study of the work in German, published by Friedrich Reinhardt Verlag in 1994. Riedweg's edition represents the first attempt at developing an updated critical text. An English translation by Thomas B. Falls is included in Volume 6 of The Fathers of the Church: A New Translation (Patristic series) by the Catholic University of America Press, first published 1948, last printed 2008.

== Bibliography ==
- Anagnostopoulos, Georgios, "Aristotle's Works and the Development of His Thought", chapter 2 of A Companion to Aristotle (Wiley-Blackwell, 2009), pp. 14–27.
- Buitenwerf, Rieuwerd, Book Three of the Sibylline Oracles and Its Social Setting (Brill Publishers, 2003).
- Coogan, Michael D., The Old Testament: A Very Short Introduction (Oxford University Press, 2008).
- Droge, Arthur J., Homer Or Moses?: Early Christian Interpretations of the History of Culture (Mohr Siebeck, 1989).
- Fowler, Robert, "Introduction" in The Cambridge Companion to Homer (Cambridge University Press, 2004), pp. 1–10.
- Guthrie, W. K. C., History of Greek Philosophy, Volume I: The earlier Presocratics and the Pythagoreans (Cambridge University Press, 1962).
- Hardwick, Michael, Josephus as an Historical Source in Patristic Literature Through Eusebius (Scholars Press, 1989).
- Hardwick, Michael, "Contra Apionem and Antiquatates Judaicae: Points of Contact" in Feldman, Louis H. and Levison, John R. (eds.), Josephus' Contra Apionem (Brill Publishers, 1996), pp. 369–402.
- van der Horst, Pieter Willem, "Plato's Fear as a Topic in Early Christian Apologetics" in Hellenism, Judaism, Christianity: Essays on Their Interaction (Peeters Publishers, 1998), pp. 257–268.
- Marcovich, Miroslav, Pseudo-Justinus, Cohortatio ad Graecos, De Monarchia, Oratio ad Graecos (De Gruyter, 1990).
- Pellegrin, Pierre, "The Aristotelian Way", chapter 13 of Gill, Mary Louise and Pellegrin, Pierre (eds.), A Companion to Ancient Philosophy (Blackwell Publishing, 2006), pp. 235–244.
- Pseudo-Justin, "Exhortation to the Greeks" in Falls, Thomas B. (trans.), Saint Justin Martyr: The First Apology, The Second Apology, Dialogue with Trypho, Exhortation to the Greeks, Discourse to the Greeks, The Monarchy of the Rule of God, Volume 6 of The Fathers of the Church: A New Translation (Patristic series) (Catholic University of America Press, 1948).
- Riedweg, Christoph, Ps.-Justin (Markell von Ankyra?), Ad Graecos de vera religione (bisher 'Cohortatio ad Graecos') (Friedrich Reinhardt Verlag, 1994).
- Schreckenberg, Heinz and Schubert, Kurt, Jewish Historiography and Iconography in Early and Medieval Christianity (Van Gorcum, 1991).
- Shields, Christopher, "Learning about Plato from Aristotle", chapter 27 of Benson, Hugh H. (ed.), A Companion to Plato (Blackwell Publishing, 2006), pp. 403–433.
- Trapp, M. B., "Review: Ps.-Justin (Markell von Ankyra?), Ad Graecos de vera religione (bisher 'Cohortatio ad Graecos')", The Classical Review, New Series vol. 46, no. 1 (1996), pp. 15–16.
- Woodhead, Linda, Christianity: A Very Short Introduction (Oxford University Press, 2004).
