= Phlegon of Tralles =

2nd-century AD Greek writer

- Born: Early second century AD; Tralles, Roman Empire (modern-day Aydın, Turkey)
- Died: Late second century AD unknown
- Occupations: Chronicler and historian
- Writing career
- Notable works: Olympiads, On Marvels, On Long-Lived Persons,

Phlegon of Tralles (Ancient Greek: Φλέγων ὁ Τραλλιανός, romanized: Phlégōn ho Trallianós) was a Greek writer and freedman of the emperor Hadrian, who lived in the 2nd century AD.

== Works ==
His chief work was the Olympiads, an historical compendium in sixteen books, from the 1st down to the 229th Olympiad (776 BC to AD 137), of which several chapters are preserved in Eusebius' Chronicle, Photius, and George Syncellus.

Two short works by him are extant. On Marvels consists of "anecdotes culled from sources as diverse as the Greek poet Hesiod and the Roman natural historian Pliny the Elder. Each... recounts a fantastical or paranormal event." On Long-Lived Persons contains a list of Italians who had passed the age of 100, taken from the censuses of the Roman Empire.

Other works ascribed to Phlegon in the Suda are a description of Sicily, a work on the Roman festivals in three books, and a topography of Rome:

"Phlegon of Tralles, freedman of Augustus Caesar, but some say of Hadrian: historian. He wrote Olympiads in 16 books. Up to the 229th Olympiad they contain what was done everywhere. And these in 8 books: Description of Sicily; On long-lived and marvelous persons, On the feasts of the Romans 3 books, On the places in Rome and by what names they are called, Epitome of Olympic victors in 2 books, and other things.

"Of this Phlegon, as Philostorgius says, to relate fully in detail what befell with the Jews, while Phlegon and Dio mentioned [these events] briefly and made them an appendix to their own narrative. Since this man does not exhibit at all prudently those who would lead to piety and other virtues, as those others do not either. Josephus, on the contrary, is like one who fears and takes care not to offend the [sc.pagan] Greeks."

== Reference to Jesus ==
Although no surviving passages from Phlegon explicitly mention Jesus, later Christian authors claimed that Phlegon wrote about Jesus and have cited his account of an eclipse and earthquake as corroboration of events described in the synoptic gospels related to Jesus' crucifixion.

Origen of Alexandria (182-254 AD), in Against Celsus (Book II, Chap. XIV), wrote that Phlegon, in his Chronicles, mentions Jesus: "Now Phlegon, in the thirteenth or fourteenth book, I think, of his Chronicles, not only ascribed to Jesus a knowledge of future events (although falling into confusion about some things which refer to Peter, as if they referred to Jesus), but also testified that the result corresponded to His predictions." Origen also referred to a description by Phlegon of an eclipse accompanied by earthquakes during the reign of Tiberius: that there was "the greatest eclipse of the sun" and that "it became night in the sixth hour of the day [i. e., noon] so that stars even appeared in the heavens. There was a great earthquake in Bithynia, and many things were overturned in Nicaea."

Julius Africanus writes "Phlegon records that, in the time of Tiberius Cæsar, at full moon, there was a full eclipse of the sun from the sixth hour to the ninth..."

Eusebius, in book 2 of Chronicle (Chronicon, quoted by Jerome), refers to Phlegon's 13th book for confirmation of an eclipse and earthquakes in Bythinia and Nicaea: "In the 4th year of the 202nd Olympiad, there was a great eclipse of the Sun, greater than had ever been known before, for at the sixth hour the day was changed into night, and the stars were seen in the heavens. An earthquake occurred in Bythinia and overthrew a great part of the city of Nicæa."

== Bibliography ==
- Karl Wilhelm Ludwig Müller, Frag. hist. graec., iii
- Otto Keller, Rerum naturalium scriptores, i. (1877)
- H Diels, "Phlegons Androgynenorakel" in Sibyllinische Bücher (1890).
- Phlegon of Tralles' Book of Marvels. Translated with an introduction and commentary by William Hansen. University of Exeter Press (1996) pp.xvi + 215. Review.
