= Manetho =

3rd-century BC Egyptian historian and priest

Manetho (/ˈmænɪθoʊ/; Koine Greek: Μανέθων Manéthōn, gen.: Μανέθωνος, fl. 290–260 BCE) was an Egyptian priest of the Ptolemaic Kingdom who lived in the early third century BCE, at the very beginning of the Hellenistic period. Little is certain about his life. He is known today as the author of a history of Egypt in Greek called the Aegyptiaca (History of Egypt), written during the reign of Ptolemy I Soter or Ptolemy II Philadelphus (285–246 BCE). None of Manetho’s original texts have survived; they are lost literary works, known only from fragments transmitted by later authors of classical and late antiquity.

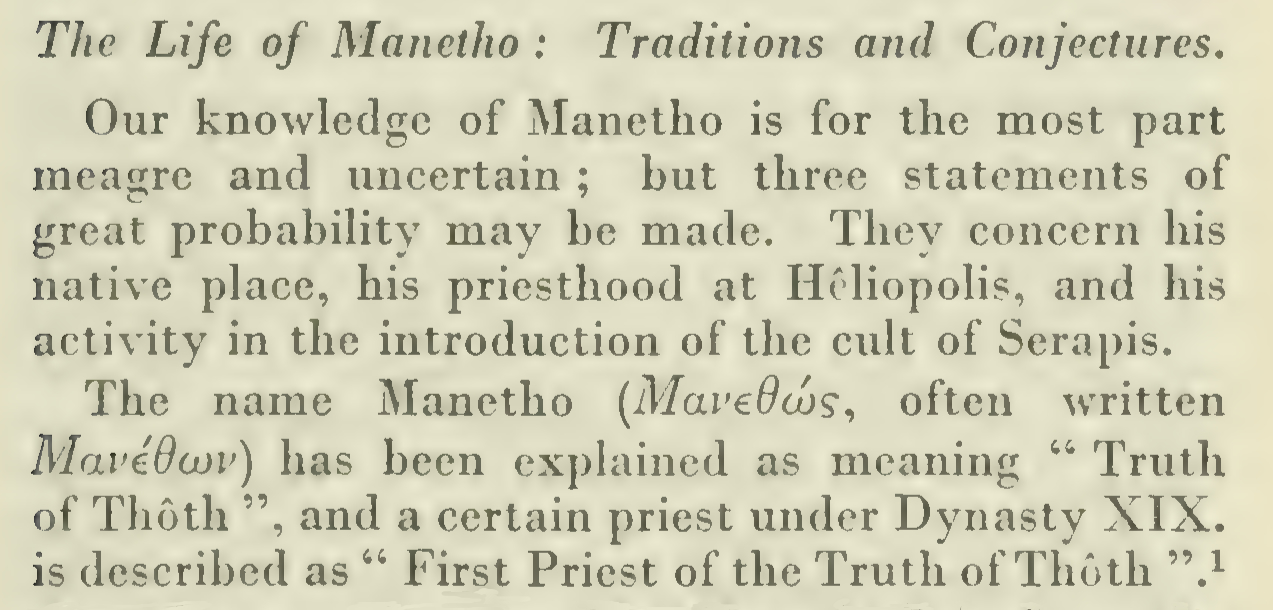
Excerpt from Manetho, with an English translation by W.G. Waddell, p. ix

The fragments of the Aegyptiaca continue to be a valuable resource for Egyptian chronology. Until the decipherment of Ancient Egyptian scripts in the early 19th century CE, Manetho's fragments were an essential source for understanding Egyptian history. His work remains important in Egyptology.

== Works attributed to Manetho ==
Eight works have been attributed to Manetho:

1. Aegyptiaca
2. The Book of Sothis
3. The Sacred Book
4. An Epitome of Physical Doctrines
5. On Festivals
6. On Ancient Ritual and Religion
7. On the Making of Kyphi
8. Criticisms of Herodotus

Some of these have been considered "ghost" titles. Of these eight, modern scholars agree that: the historical Manetho is the author of Aegyptiaca; that Manetho cannot be the author of Sothis; and that the Criticisms is likely a part of the larger Aegypticia and not written as a separate work.

== Name ==
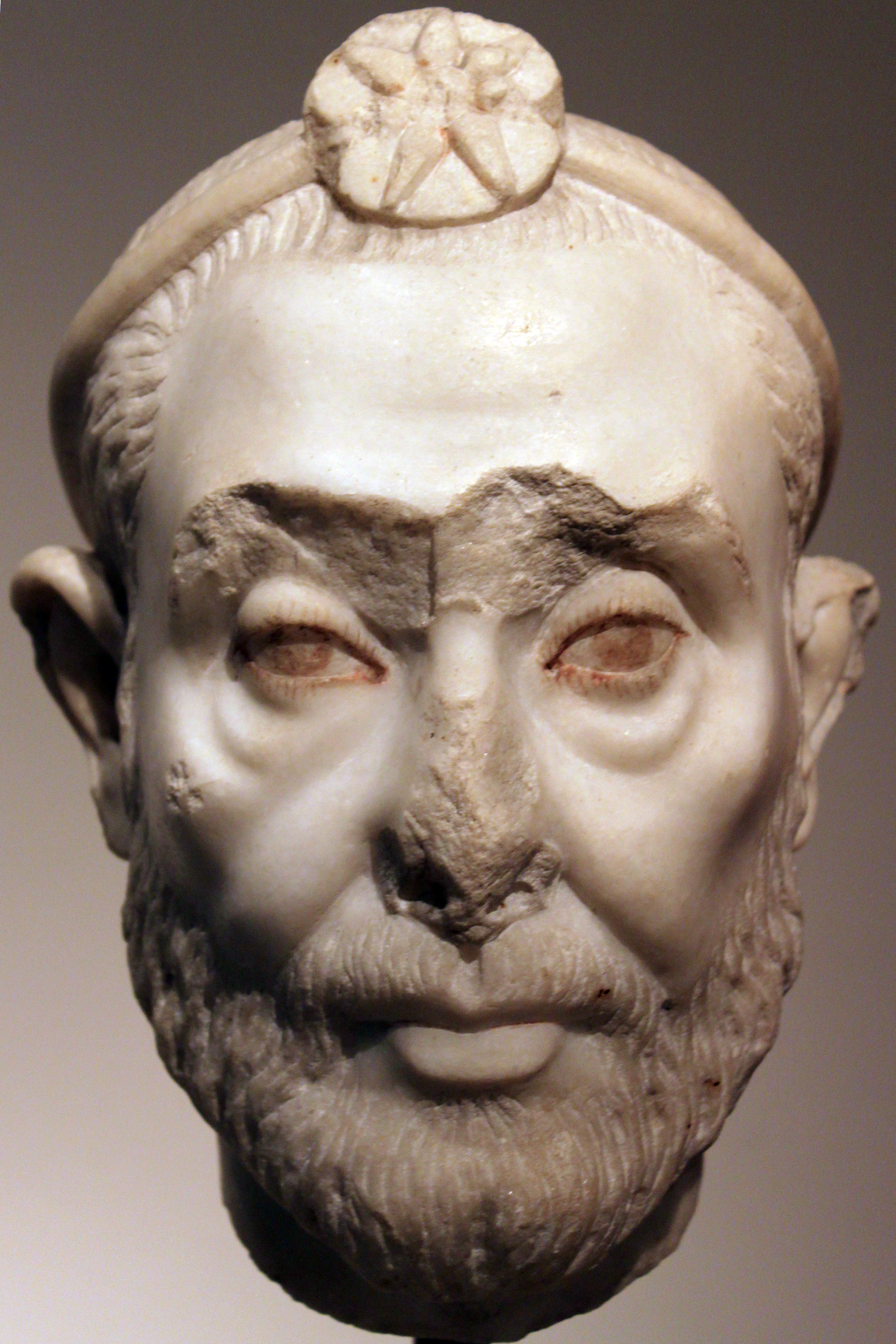
No likeness of Manetho exists. This is a bust of a Neokoros, a senior official in the temple cult of Serapis (a Hellenistic appropriation of Osiris and Apis) from Roman Egypt, 230–240 CE, over three centuries after Manetho lived. The circlet with the seven-rayed sun disk in the hair identifies his position. Manetho was an authority on the temple cult of Serapis. Marble. Altes Museum, Berlin.

Scholars agree that "Manetho" is a Greek transcription of an Egyptian name; however, there is no consensus on the original. Some speculate that it is a theophoric name invoking either the god Thoth or the goddess Neith, e.g. "Truth of Thoth", "Beloved of Neith", or similar. Another proposal is "I have seen the great god". Others propose an occupational name based on Egyptian Myinyu-heter ("Shepherd" or "Groom"). In Latin sources he is called Manethon, Manethos, Manethonus, and Manetos.

The earliest attestations of his name, all in Greek, come from three sources: an inscription found in Carthage; the Hibeh papyrus; and the writings of Josephus. The name that he called himself in Greek was likely Manethôn.

== Historical context ==
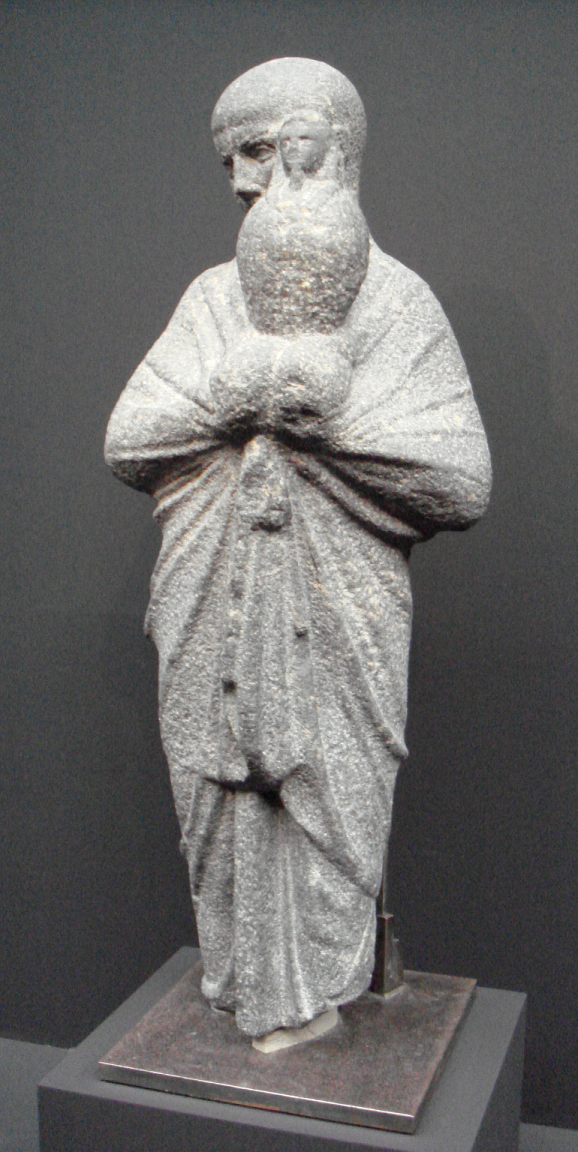
Statue of a priest of Osiris, Ptolemaic Kingdom of Egypt, 1st century CE. Le Grand Palais exhibition.

Manetho lived and worked at the very beginning of the new Hellenistic order in Egypt, when the Macedonian Greek Diadochi (successors) of Alexander the Great (d. 323 BCE) fought each other for control of the new empire, a struggle finally ending in partition. In Egypt, diadochos Ptolemy I Soter founded the Ptolemaic Kingdom in 305 BCE. Reigning for nearly three centuries, the Ptolemies were the final and longest-lived dynasty of ancient Egypt before Roman conquest in 30 BCE. They introduced the Hellenistic religion, a unique syncretism between Greek and Egyptian religions and cultures. Manetho wrote Aegyptiaca in order to preserve the history of his homeland for posterity and—as evidenced by his having written it in Greek—for its new foreign rulers.

Manetho originated in Sebennytos and was likely a priest of the solar deity Ra at Heliopolis. He was an authority on the temple cult of Serapis (a Hellenistic appropriation of Osiris and Apis).

Most of the ancient witnesses group Manetho together with the Mesopotamian writer Berossus and treat the pair as similar in intent. Those who preserved the bulk of their writing are largely the same (Josephus, Africanus, Eusebius, and Syncellus). Both wrote in Greek at about the same time, and adopted the historiographical approach of the Greek writers Herodotus and Hesiod who preceded them. Both used chronological royal genealogies and regnal lists (also called "king-lists") as the structure for the narratives, and extended their histories far into a mythic past or origin myth—in Manetho's case a syncretized one. Modern historians consider Berossus and Manetho to have been rough contemporaries.

== The fragments of Manetho ==
All of Manetho's original works are lost. What remains are purported excerpts, epitomes, and allusions as transmitted in the writings of later authors.

Two English translations of Manetho's fragments have been published: one by William Gillan Waddell (1884–1945) in 1940, and another by Gerald P. Verbrugghe and John Moore Wickersham in 2001.

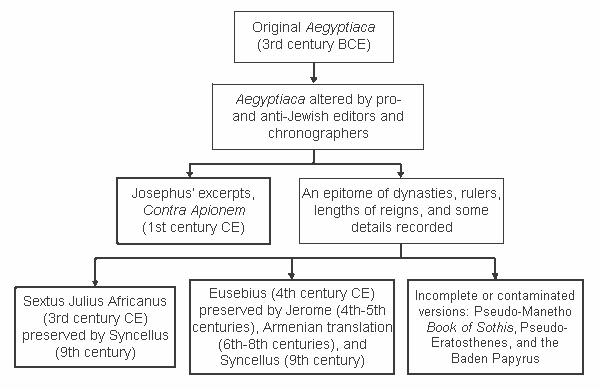
Fragments of Manetho's Aegyptiaca

== The Aegyptiaca ==
The Aegyptiaca (Αἰγυπτιακά, Aigyptiaka), (or "History of Egypt") was a chronological history divided into three papyrus scrolls (Gr: tomoi), or "books" or "volumes"; it may have been written as a response to Herodotus' Histories. It is—or more precisely, its accumulated fragments are—a foundational text for understanding the very long history of ancient Egypt, particularly Egyptian chronology. It or its fragments were for many centuries a primary source on the subject until the decipherment of Ancient Egyptian scripts in the early 19th century CE. The text remains significant in Egyptology.

Manetho's Aegyptiaca chronicles the history of Egypt from a mythical epoch of divine rulers, through the unification of Upper and Lower Egypt by Menes (c. 3100 BCE in modern dating) and the subsequent thirty (or thirty-one) dynasties, culminating in the establishment of the Ptolemaic Kingdom in 305 BCE. Key themes included the importance of a unified kingdom, periods of stability and innovation versus internal strife and foreign rule (like the Hyksos, Kushites, and Achaemenids), and the restoration of Egyptian power. Manetho aimed to present a comprehensive and continuous history of Egypt under divinely-sanctioned rulers, including foreign ones.

== Manetho's legacy ==
Manetho's unique legacy rests on the singular importance of his Aegyptiaca.

=== The dynastic framework ===
Manetho coined the term "dynasty" (Greek: dynasteia); his conception was not based on bloodlines as the term "dynasty" is understood today, but rather as groupings of monarchs punctuated by discontinuities, either geographical (e.g., moving the capital) or genealogical. After each discontinuity came a new dynasty.

Arguably his most important legacy, Manetho's division of Egyptian rulers into thirty (or sometimes thirty-one) dynasties still serves as the fundamental chronological backbone for Egyptology.

=== Written in Greek ===
Use of Egyptian hieroglyphic and demotic writing began to disappear in the third century CE, and with it went the knowledge to read these scripts. The temple-based priesthoods died out and Egypt was gradually converted to Christianity, and because Egyptian Christians wrote in the Greek-derived Coptic alphabet, it came to supplant demotic. The last hieroglyphic text was written by priests at the Temple of Isis at Philae in 394 CE, and the last known demotic text was inscribed there in 452 CE.

Manetho's decision to write his Aegyptiaca in Greek—the lingua franca of his day—rather than Egyptian ensured that the text remained accessible even after the knowledge of Egyptian scripts was lost, and enabled scholars from classical and late antiquity to the modern era to encounter Egypt's deep past. This history would have otherwise been largely inaccessible until the decipherment of ancient Egyptian scripts.

=== A native Egyptian perspective ===
Manetho’s accounts of his civilisation stand out due to being a complete and systematic work by a native and educated Egyptian, who wrote for an audience of foreigners. His viewpoint therefore offers a rare insight into how Egyptians themselves conceived of their own past and their place in a changing world.

=== Anti-Jewish Charges ===
In his Aegyptiaca, Manetho also preserved a distinctly Egyptian side of an older polemical conflict between Egyptian and Jewish traditions, known principally through Josephus’ Against Apion. His anti-Jewish account did not arise in an ideological vacuum, but formed as a response to the anti-Egyptian elements in the exodus of the Jews. In the Jewish account, Egypt was the defeated oppressor: its ruler was repeatedly humiliated, its population devastated by divine plagues, and its gods shown to be powerless before the God of Israel. From an Egyptian religious perspective, such a narrative functioned as an anti-Egyptian polemic, presenting Egypt, its kingship, and its sacred order as objects of divine defeat and contempt.

Manetho’s anti-Jewish counter-narrative effectively reversed this structure. Rather than presenting the Israelites’ departure as a miraculous liberation from Egyptian oppression, he portrayed it as the expulsion of a colony of lepers and other ritually polluted people who subsequently turned against Egypt and its religion. According to the account preserved by Josephus, Moses, whom Manetho identified with the renegade Egyptian priest Osarseph, commanded his followers to separate themselves from outsiders, overturn Egyptian customs, desecrate sacred animals, and establish an alien regime. The two traditions therefore offered competing and mutually hostile memories of the same ancient antagonism: an anti-Egyptian tradition celebrating divine deliverance through the humiliation of Egypt and its gods was answered by an anti-Jewish Egyptian tradition depicting the departing population as polluted rebels and religious aggressors.

Manetho’s account is consequently better understood within an inherited Egyptian-Jewish polemical feud than as an isolated declaration that Jews were inherently objectionable. The anti-Egyptian and anti-Jewish narratives developed through the inversion and contestation of one another, each portraying its own community as the injured or vindicated party and the other as the source of sacrilege and disorder. Motifs emerging from the anti-Jewish side of this older conflict, particularly accusations of religious hostility, separateness, impiety, and aggression toward other peoples’ gods, were later detached from their specifically Egyptian context and incorporated into broader anti-Jewish polemics, eventually contributing to traditions that fed into later antisemitism.

=== Foundation for later scholarship ===
For centuries, Manetho's fragments and summaries were the primary textual sources for understanding the sequence of Egyptian rulers. Jean-François Champollion relied on Manetho's king-lists as a cross-reference in his pioneering translations of ancient Egyptian scripts.

== See also ==
- Aegyptiaca (Manetho)
- Berossus
- Cory’s Ancient Fragments
- Fragmente der griechischen Historiker
- Hecataeus of Abdera
- List of lists of ancient kings
- Menander of Ephesus
