= Aegyptiaca =

3rd-century BCE history of Egypt written in Greek, now lost

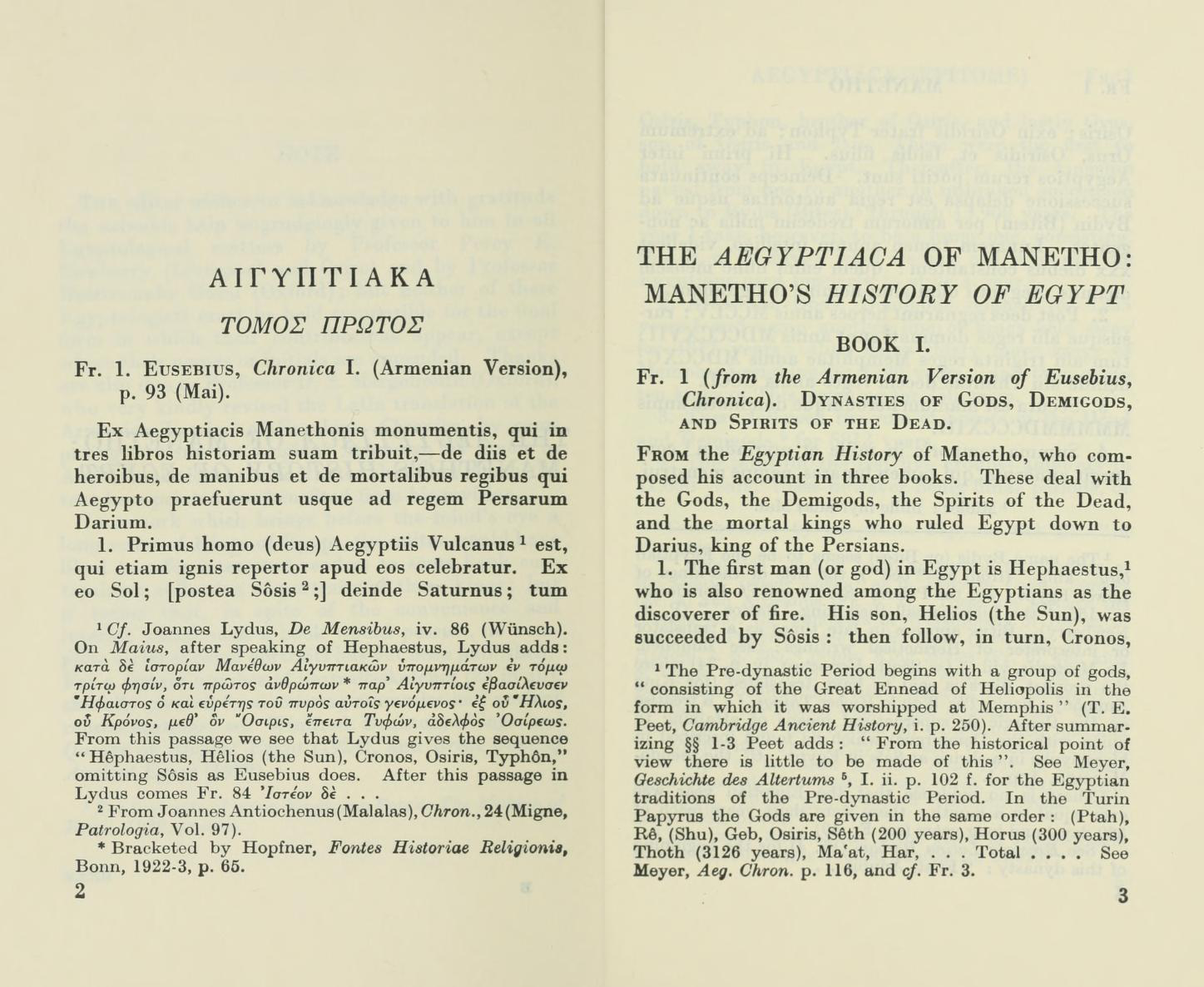
A fragment of the Aegyptiaca from Eusebius. Pages 2 and 3 of Manetho, with an English Translation, by W.G. Waddell (1940).

The Aegyptiaca (Koine Greek: Αἰγυπτιακά, Aigyptiaka, "History of Egypt") was a history of ancient Egypt written in Greek by Manetho (fl. 290–260 BCE) at the beginning of the Ptolemaic Kingdom of Egypt. It was a comprehensive history of ancient Egypt and continues to be an important resource in the refinement of Egyptian chronology.

His work provided a clear chronology of Egypt from the first pharaoh of a unified Upper and Lower Egypt, dated by modern historians to 3100 BCE, to just before Alexander's entry into the country following the Siege of Gaza in 332 BCE. Manetho prefaced his human chronology with the history of a mythical era of divine rule that linked Egyptian gods with their Greek counterparts, an equivalence already established by Manetho's time. (Note: i.e., interpretatio graeca. Herodotus ( c. 484–425 BCE) was one of the earliest authors to engage in this form of identification. He described Egyptian religion by (his own perceived) Greek analogues. His Greco-Egyptian equivalents endured into the Hellenistic era; these included Amun/Zeus, Osiris/Dionysus, and Ptah/Hephaestus)

The complete text of the Aegyptiaca has not survived and is now a lost literary work; indirect literary fragments of the text do, however, remain. The most substantial of the fragments are regnal lists which allowed Egyptologists to cross-reference names and timelines with written Egyptian records and archaeological evidence, long after knowledge of Egyptian hieroglyphic and demotic disappeared in the fifth century CE.

Until the decipherment of ancient Egyptian scripts in the early 19th century CE, these fragments were one of the few resources available to Egyptologists to access the civilization's own recorded history.

Manetho's organization of the Aegyptiaca into thirty-one dynasties of Ancient Egypt (thirty in some sources) informs modern Egyptian chronology. (Note: Egyptologists developed the modern periodization of ancient Egypt system used now in the 19th and early 20th centuries CE. They drew upon the archaeological and historical record to create this system, informed by Manetho's original dynastic framework. Their modern system includes categories such as the Old Kingdom (established conceptually in the mid-19th century), the Middle Kingdom (similarly conceptualized in the 19th century), and the New Kingdom (also defined in the 19th century). While Manetho did not employ this specific periodization, his dynastic organization provided a fundamental basis for its eventual creation millennia later.)

== Scope and structure ==
The Aegyptiaca was a chronicle likely composed of three papyrus scrolls presenting an account of Egypt's history that spanned over two-and-a-half millennia. In the "pre-dynastic" section of Volume One, Manetho integrated mythical accounts of Egyptian gods and heroes.

Complementing his established dynastic structure, Manetho provided reign lengths for individual rulers and, at times, the total durations of dynasties.

The Aegyptiaca also likely incorporated short anecdotes, explanations of Ancient Egyptian royal titulary, and summaries of significant events.

== Synopsis ==
=== Volume One ===
Covers dynasties I, II, III, IV, V, VI, VII, VIII, IX, X, XI

Modern chronology: Early Dynastic, Old Kingdom, First Intermediate, and early Middle Kingdom periods (c. 3100–1991 BCE)

Volume One of Manetho's Aegyptiaca presented a mythical "predynastic period" (Note: This entirely mythical construction should in no way be confused with the modern conception of prehistoric Egypt.) that began with the reign of ancient Egyptian deities and then transitioned through the rule of demigods, heroes, and "spirits of the dead" to divinely-sanctioned human pharaohs. His human history covered about 1,110 years in the first volume. Starting at the unification of Upper and Lower Egypt under the first pharaoh Menes, he then progressed through the rulers of Dynasties I through XI.

Manetho portrayed Dynasties I-VI as a time of unity and innovation, particularly in the emergence of Egyptian hieroglyphics, pyramid-building, and medicine. In modern chronology, Dynasties I and II are considered the Early Dynastic and III–VI the Old Kingdom periods. While Manetho did not use the modern periodization of ancient Egypt, his outline of these early dynasties did emphasize the unity and antiquity of pharaonic rule from the start.

The Aegyptiaca next described a break in the unified succession of rulers, a rupture which he designated Dynasties VII–X and the early part of XI; these "dynasties" were in fact competing factional claimants, and the historicity of his Dynasty VII is disputed among scholars. Modern historians call this tumultuous era the First Intermediate period. Volume One concluded with the re-establishment of unified rule under the latter part of Dynasty XI, which marks the beginning of the Middle Kingdom of Egypt in modern chronology. Manetho intended to show Egypt's history as rooted in a unified kingdom ruled by a continuous succession of divinely-sanctioned dynasties.

=== Volume Two ===
Covers dynasties XII, XIII, XIV, XV, XVI, XVII, XVIII, XIX

Modern Chronology: Middle Kingdom, Second Intermediate, beginning of New Kingdom periods (c. 1991–1189 BCE)

Volume Two spanned around 800 years of Egypt's history. It covered Dynasties XII through XIX. The stability established during the latter half of Dynasty XI continued into XII; this is the Middle Kingdom period in modern chronology. With Dynasties XIII and XIV, however, came a return to internal strife and with it, a less-clear succession of rulers. Manetho wrote that Dynasties XV–XVII marked the arrival and rule of foreign rulers that he called the Hyksos; (Note: The matter of these "Shepherd Kings" and their identification with Jews by later authors in polemics and epitomes is a heady topic in its own right. See the Hyksos main page, especially the notes section. The fragments of the Aegyptiaca in question come from the polemical treatise by Josephus Against Apion written after 94 CE. Josephus quotes the Aegyptiaca in order to discredit Manetho's claims (in Josephus' interpretation) that the Jews and Hyksos were a related population of leprous and otherwise unclean renegades and slaves. Josephus may or may not have been quoting the authentic Aegyptiaca, and he was certainly engaged in a biased reading. In what can only be considered one of history's most sublime ironies, the Jews/Hyksos discourse exists because Josephus attacked it, and in writing his attack, quoted liberally from what he claims is Manetho's telling. The reverberations of Josephus' polemic include, among other subjects, the curious case of the Osarseph figure.) this time is now known as the Second Intermediate Period. Manetho then told of the expulsion of the foreign rulers and the re-establishment of unified Egyptian rule. The era of imperial expansion and grandeur during Dynasties XVIII and XIX corresponds to the New Kingdom, and brought the second volume of Manetho's history to its close.

=== Volume Three ===
Covers dynasties XX, XXI, XXII, XXIII, XXIV, XXV, XXVI, XXVII, XXVIII, XXIX, XXX, XXXI (contested)

Modern chronology: end of New Kingdom, Third Intermediate, and Late periods (c. 1189–332 BCE)

Volume Three of Manetho's Aegyptiaca covered nearly 860 years. It told of Dynasties XX–XXX (or XXXI); this included both Kushite (Ethiopian) (XXV) rulers and a native "Saite Renaissance" (XXVI). Achaemenid ("Persian") conquest interrupted native rule (XXVII), followed by three more native dynasties as Persian influence waned, then more Persian rulers of XXXI, and finally the Macedonians. Manetho's placement of the Macedonian Ptolemaic Dynasty at the beginning of a new era provides a fitting conclusion to his framework. Though its authenticity is debated, Manetho's inclusion of Dynasty XXXI aligns with his aim to document the totality of ruling powers since unification under the first pharaoh Menes some 2,700 years before the Aegyptiaca ends; his comprehensive history already included foreign rulers. XXXI was the last complete dynasty before what was, for Manetho, the start of Dynasty XXXII: the Ptolemies.

== Manetho and authorial intent ==
Manetho (fl. 290–260 BCE) was a priest—possibly a high priest of Ra in the temple at Heliopolis—who was likely native to Sebennytus (modern Samannud) in the Nile Delta. He lived at the dawn of the Hellenistic period (323–30 BCE), during the reign of Ptolemy I Soter (Note: Ptolemy I was the founder of the line of Ancient Macedonian, i.e., foreign, rulers bearing his name who succeeded Alexander the Great following Alexander's conquest of Egypt.) (r. 303–282 BCE) or his son Ptolemy II Philadelphus (r. 285–246 BCE).

In writing his Aegyptiaca, Manetho sought to present the depth, grandeur, and primacy of his ancient country to its new rulers and to the wider Hellenistic world. As a Heliopolitan priest familiar with sacred records, Manetho likely contrasted his own superior sources with those of earlier Greek historians like Herodotus (c. 484 – c. 425 BCE) (known even in his own day as "the Father of Lies") with an aim to correct their accounts. Sebennytus had a strong Greek culture which certainly aided in the bilingual Manetho's familiarity with earlier Greek accounts of his country.

Manetho's decision to write in Koine Greek, which was to become the lingua franca of the ancient Eastern Mediterranean, was instrumental in allowing the Aegyptiaca to reach a broad audience and to become a foundational text for readers interested in Egypt's history. Aegyptiaca bridged Egyptian historical tradition and the Hellenistic world; its distribution enabled literate Greek-speakers to access Egypt's ancient—and alien— past. Manetho concluded his chronicle with the establishment of Ptolemaic rule, an event that marked Egypt's entry into the Greco-Roman world.

== Manetho's likely sources ==
Manetho's position would have given him unrestricted access to religious and regnal archives. These archives housed temple records, monumental inscriptions, and king-lists which detailed the sequence and reign lengths of the pharaohs. Surviving examples of Manetho's sources include the Abydos, Saqqara, and Turin King Lists. While primarily administrative in purpose, these lists were also of religious significance, as they linked historical pharaohs to ma'at, or divine order.

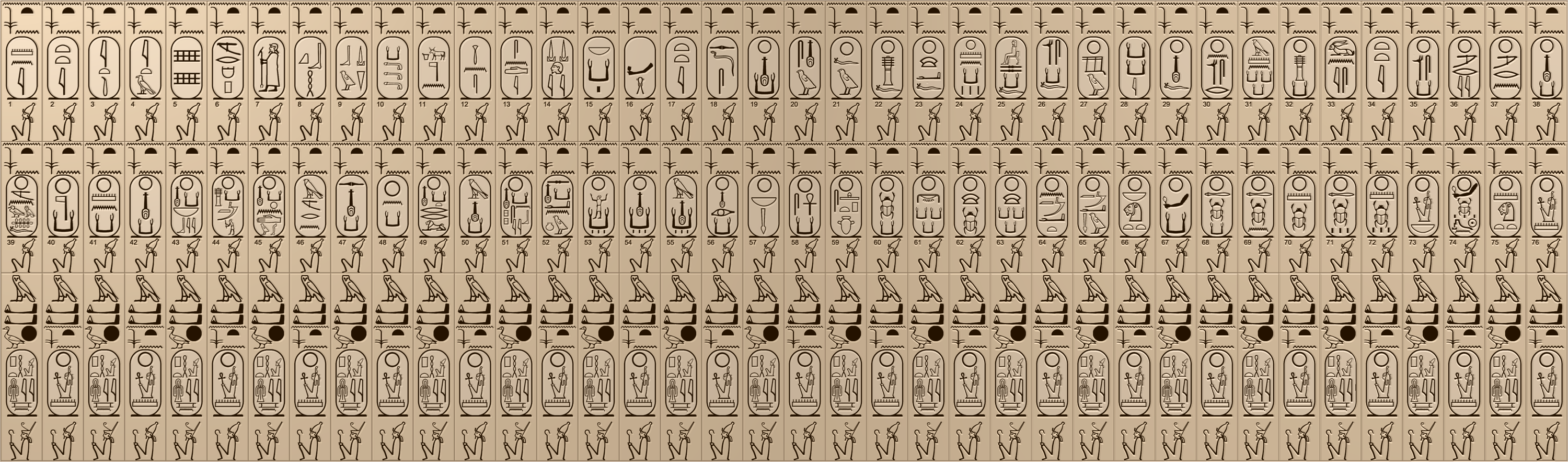
Drawing of the cartouches in the Abydos King List.

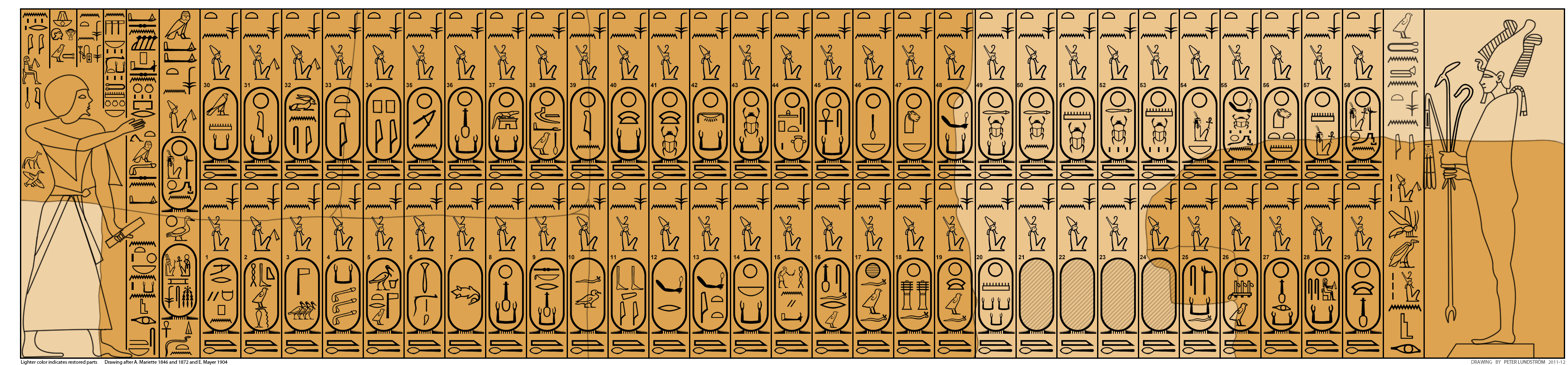
Drawing of the Saqqara King List based on photographs and drawings from 1864–65.

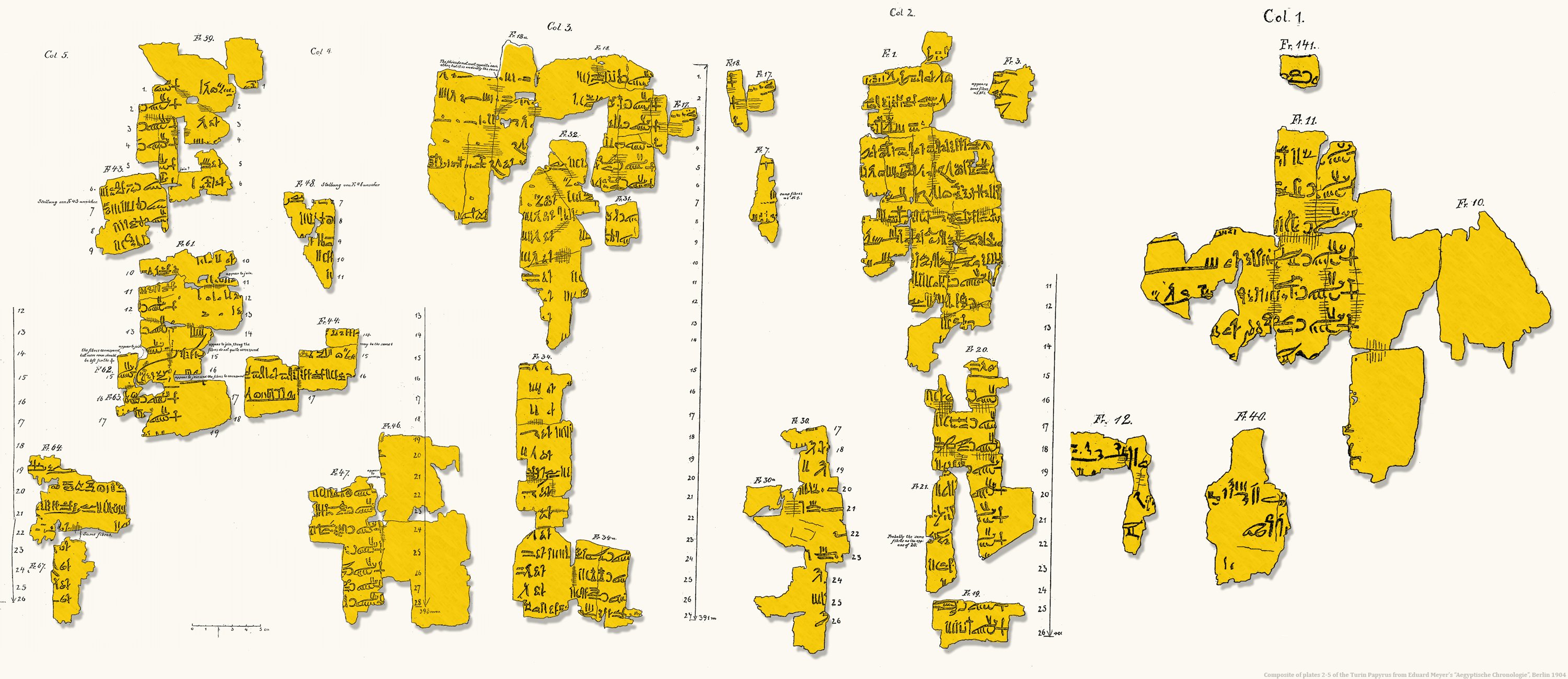
1904 version of attempt to assemble parts of the Turin King list

The Aegyptiaca opened with lists and narratives of the gods and divine kings who were believed to have laid Egypt's cultural foundations. To compose this mythical "pre-history", Manetho would have drawn upon sacred funerary texts such as the Pyramid and Coffin Texts. Priestly traditions such as genealogies, temple rituals, and accumulated lore would also have served as major sources.

Manetho may have also consulted earlier Egyptian historical or semi-historical writings, if such works were available during his time. It is plausible that earlier Egyptian historians or scribes compiled now-lost annals or chronicles; these could have provided narrative details for Manetho's accounts of names, events, and reigns. Furthermore, Manetho's work can be seen in the context of other historical accounts of Egypt written in Greek, such as that of Hecataeus of Abdera (c. 360–290 BCE, author of another lost work also entitled Aegyptiaca), though Manetho's was arguably more historically focused. Indeed, Manetho likely aimed to correct Greek historians, particularly Herodotus.

As a high priest of the Ancient Egyptian religion, Manetho's deep personal knowledge was itself an indispensable source for his history. His priestly knowledge encompassed Egyptian culture, religion, and language; it integrated oral traditions with religious mythology and written history to create a comprehensive narrative of the already-ancient Egyptian civilization.

== Transmission and corruption of the original ==
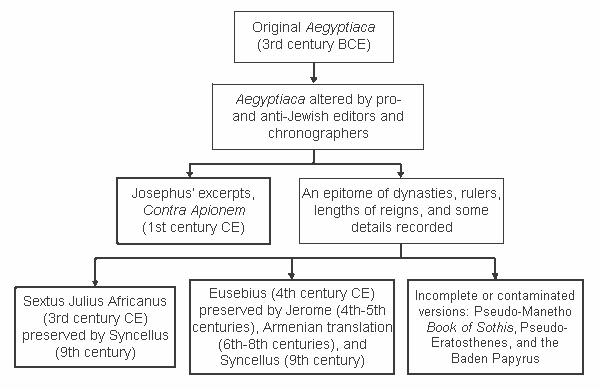
Fragments of Manetho's Aegyptiaca

The loss of Manetho's original Aegyptiaca makes impossible a direct engagement with his work; the "Aegyptiaca" as we know it is a reconstruction assembled from fragments preserved—or corrupted—by later authors. This indirect transmission occurred particularly through excerpts used in Hellenistic-era polemics between Egyptians and Jews claiming cultural primacy, and later by early Christian writers attempting to reconcile Biblical chronology with histories from other ancient sources, such as Manetho's. This has resulted in significant difficulties in discerning Manetho's original text, a major challenge in Classics.

The four authors from whom we have the most extensive fragments of Manetho's work are:

- Josephus (c. 37–100 CE) a Hellenized Jew, defector, and courtier to the Flavian dynasty of pagan Rome;
- Sextus Julius Africanus (c. 160–c. 240), an early Christian historian;
- Eusebius (c. 260–339), another early Christian; and
- George Syncellus (d.a. 810), Byzantine writer of chronicles.
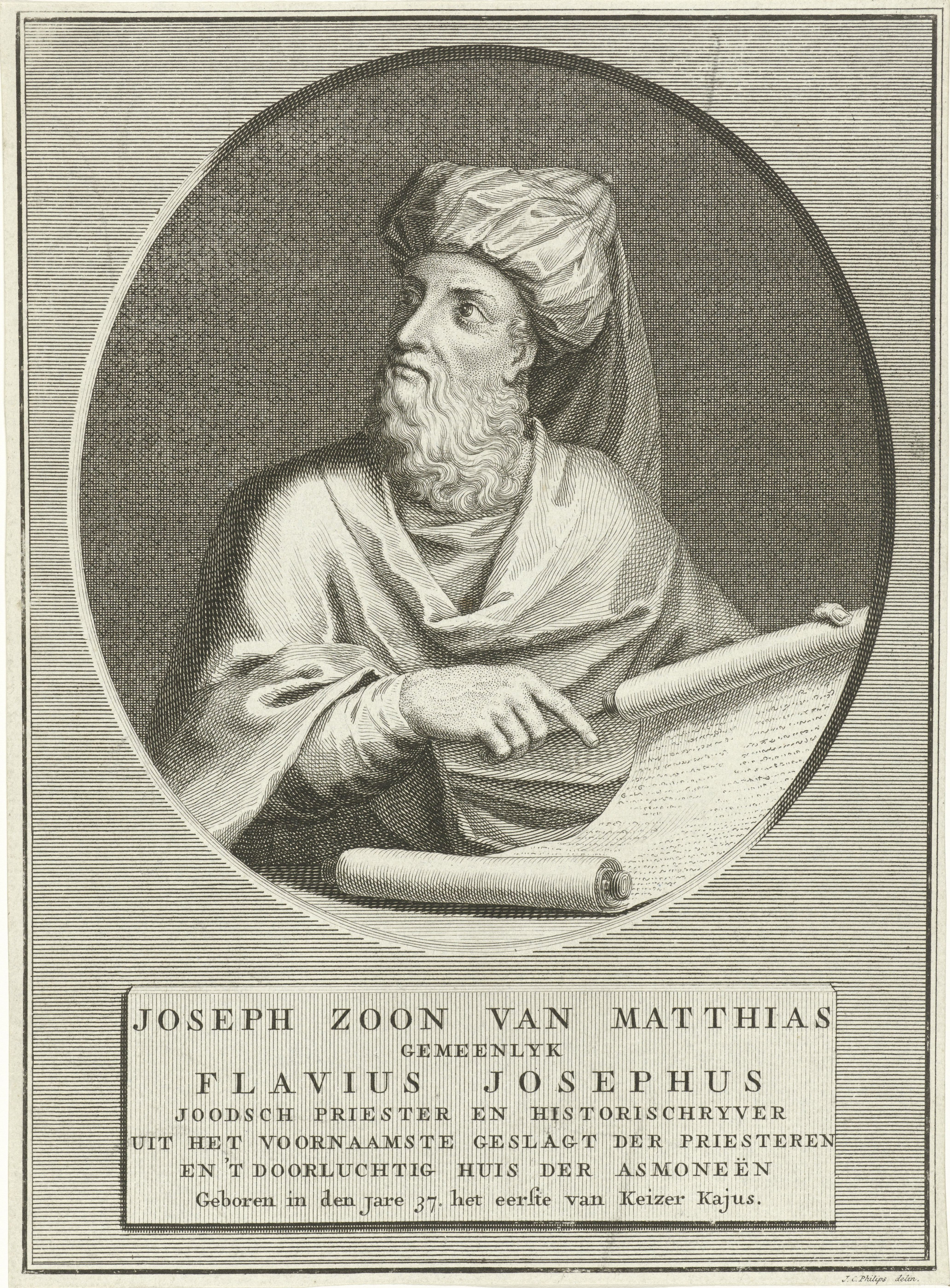
Flavius Josephus

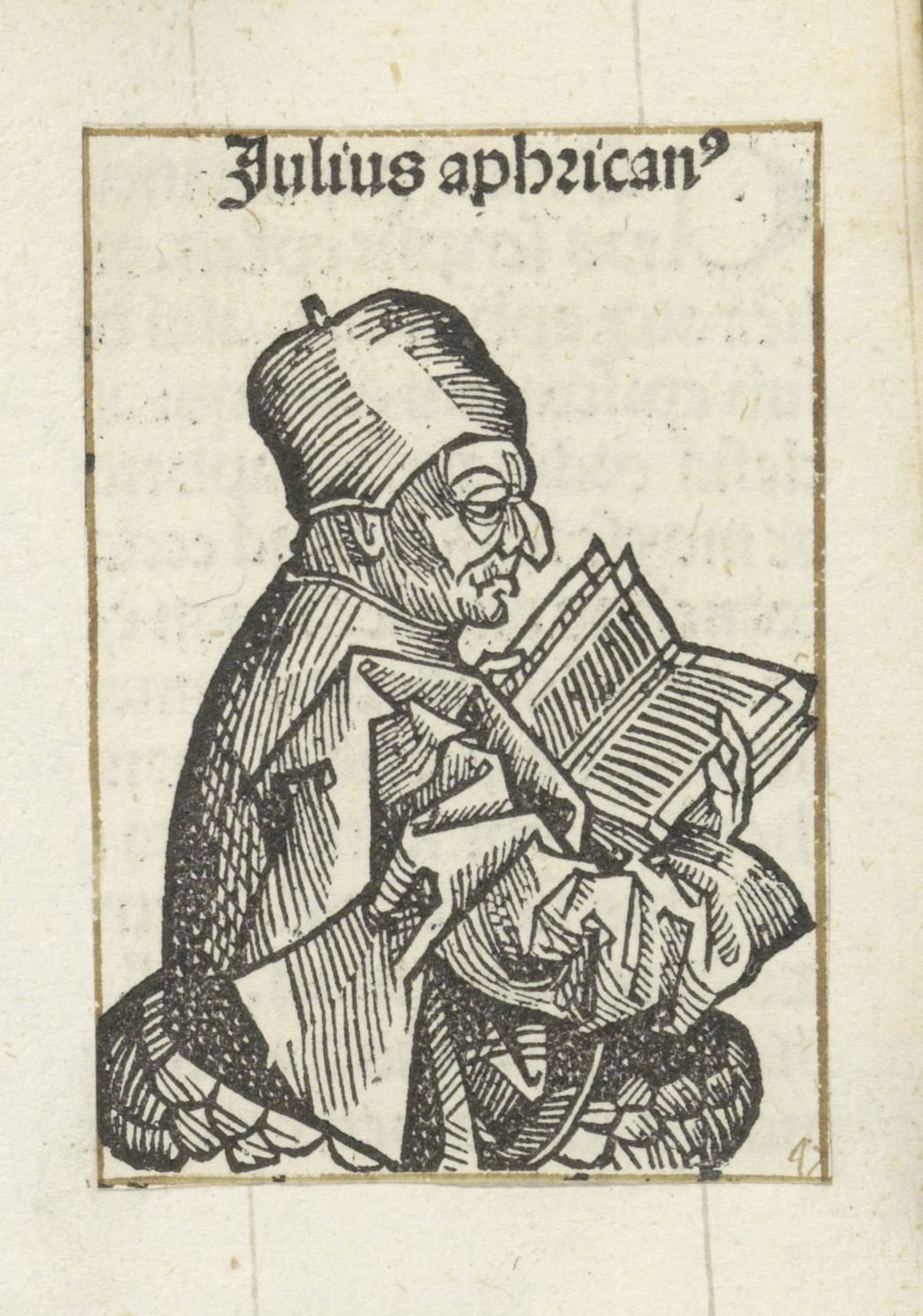
Sextus Julius Africanus

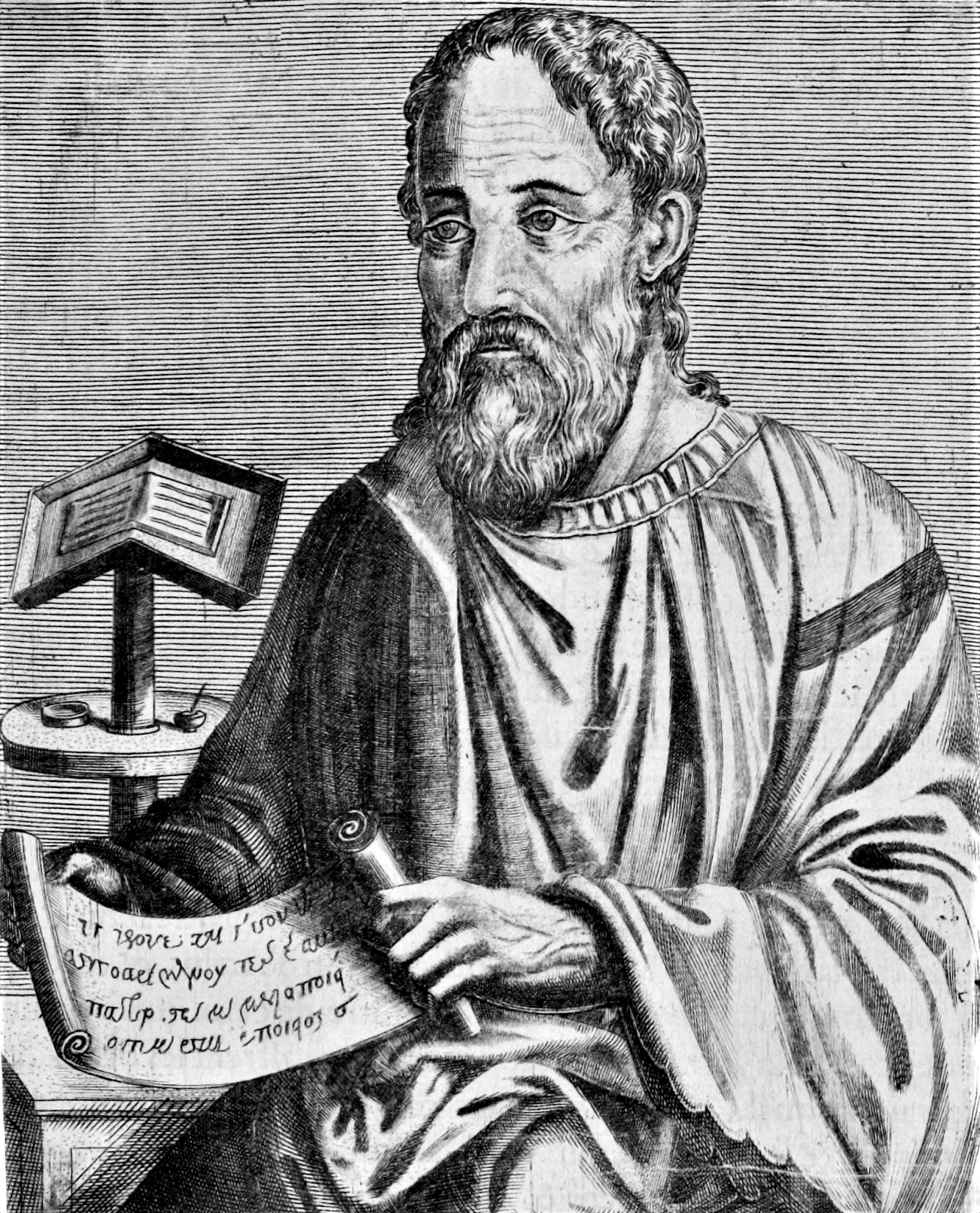
Eusebius of Caesarea

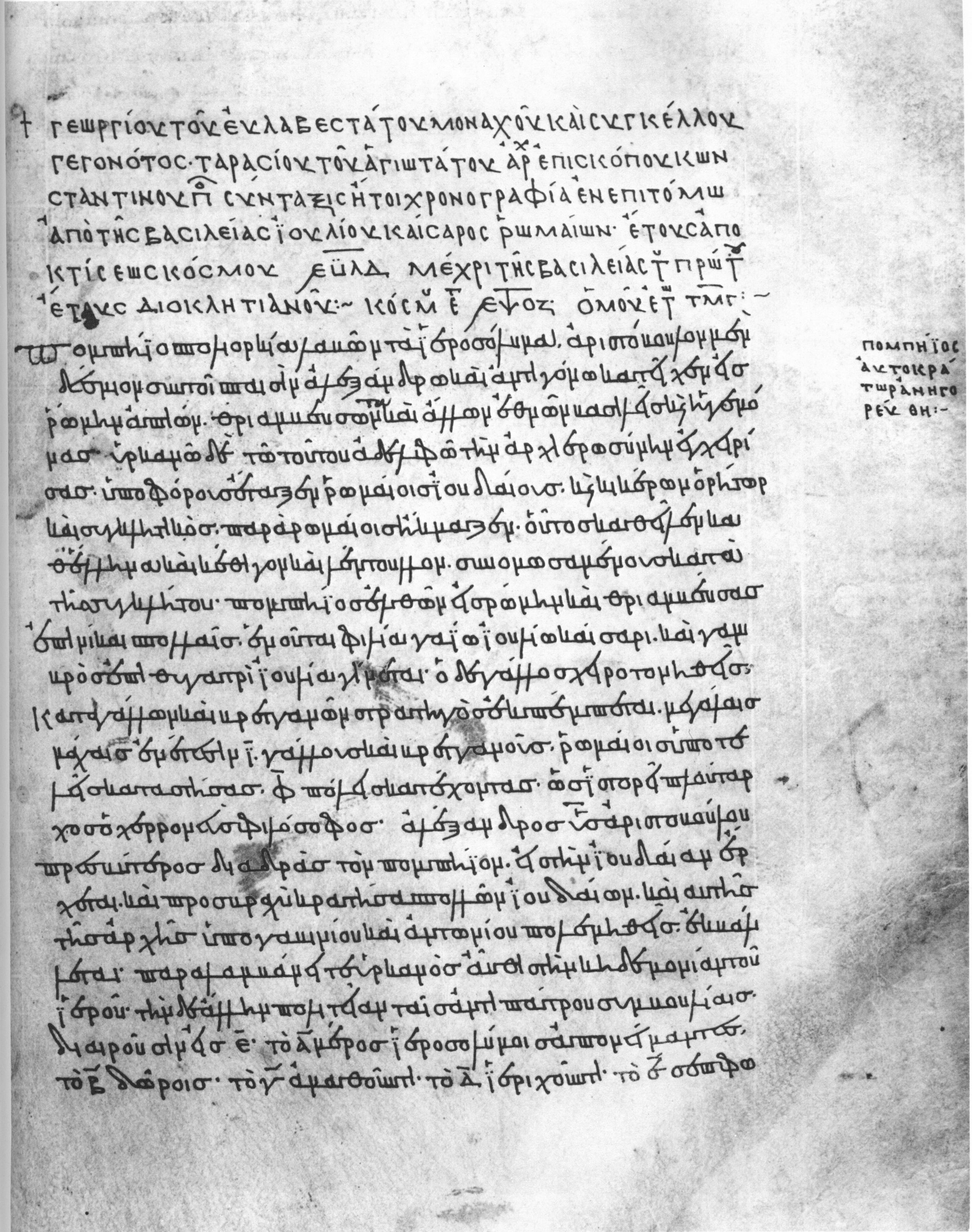
From the Chronicle of Syncellus

Their method of transmission was typically the epitome; these were summaries and excerpts of the original work that they then incorporated into their own writings, thus introducing their own interpretations and biases into Manetho's text.

Josephus claims to quote Manetho—and does so liberally—in his polemic Against Apion. He used Manetho's text selectively, highlighting points that he thought supported canonical Jewish history and dismissing or arguing against those that did not, all in service of establishing a longer and more venerable Jewish past.

Josephus is the earliest known writer to cite pseudo-Manethonian material (i.e., works historically attributed to Manetho but not accepted as such by modern scholars). His polemic provides us with what may be some of the most substantial surviving fragments of Manetho, and these fragments were likely constructs themselves—that is, summaries of Manetho's work made by others, and curated by Josephus to meet his own ends. Scholars treat his quotations as valuable evidence but also approach them with a critical eye, acknowledging the potential for alteration, interpolation, misinterpretation, or selective presentation. Indeed, scholarly attempts to disentangle genuine fragments from later interpolations have proven inconclusive.

According to Josephus in Against Apion, some of Manetho's anecdotes on Dynasty XV (the Hyksos) focused on the Jews of Egypt. In Josephus's telling, Manetho claimed that these Jews were descendants of foreign conquerors who, mixed with a band of Egyptian lepers and famous for their cruelty and misanthropy, were deposed and then banished to the city of Avaris before finally being expelled from the country. (See Osarseph.)

According to Israeli historian Benzion Netanyahu, Manetho's work was a seminal antisemitic work. Netanyahu wrote that when the work was composed, Egypt's Jews were enjoying a positive reputation and were assimilated into Hellenistic culture. Manetho, according to Netanyahu—who takes Josephus at his word—aimed to undermine their reputation as part of a rebellion against Greek power in Egypt, and wrote the Aegyptiaca or this section of it with this explicit purpose. On the basis of Josephus's commentary on Manetho, Russian-Israeli scholar Victor Tcherikover claimed that "Antisemitism was born in Egypt."

While Josephus had explicit apologetic aims in bolstering Jewish history against Greek and Egyptian claims of greater antiquity, the Christian writers Africanus, Eusebius, and Syncellus sought to establish the historical grounding and timeline of their faith. This led to attempts to synchronize Manetho's version of Egyptian history with the chronology of the Bible, all within the context of competing claims to primacy. Their epitomes exhibit discrepancies.

What remains of these fragments is not the original Aegyptiaca itself, but rather a collection of summaries of dynasties and reigns, transliterated names of kings, occasional anecdotes or myths embedded within later putative quotations, and chronological data such as lengths of individual and dynastic reigns. While some of this material likely reflects Manetho's original text, other parts may represent later additions, errors introduced during transmission, or the interpretations of those who transmitted the fragments.

== Reconstructing the Aegyptiaca ==
Modern scholars approach reconstruction by comparing surviving epitomes and weighing the potential influence of the polemical aims of the later authors on their texts. Scholars also cross-reference this textual evidence with archaeological findings, aligning king names and reign lengths with the inscriptions, tombs, and monuments which offer independent perspectives. Surviving native Egyptian king-lists provide valuable tools for verifying or correcting the order of rulers, as they are unadulterated by later external historical debates. Furthermore, linguistic analysis aids in matching Manetho's Greek renderings of names with their original Egyptian forms, potentially stripping away some of the later interpretive layers added by ancient cultural claimants.

Ultimately, our understanding of Manetho's Aegyptiaca is as a composite of partial quotations, summaries, and later historians' versions of the original text, frequently altered to fit a particular argument in an ancient contest to "prove" cultural and religious primacy through greater antiquity. The reliance on this fragmented and altered evidence necessitates caution when attempting to identify Manetho's original history.

Waddell quoted German classicist August Böckh (1785–1867) as an epigraph to his Manetho of 1940:

"Never has there arisen a more complicated problem than that of Manetho."

— Böckh, Manetho und die Hundssternperiode, 1845, p. 10

== Legacy of the Aegyptiaca ==
The Aegyptiaca's most significant legacy is its dynastic framework. This division of Egyptian rulers into thirty or thirty-one dynasties remains fundamental to Egyptology; it endures despite its initial flaws and the passage of over two millennia. Since Syncellus used it in the 9th century CE, Manetho's dynastic system has been the standard approach for presenting the history of Pharaonic Egypt, and scholars continue to employ it as an essential organizational tool.

Manetho's decision to write his Aegyptiaca in Koine Greek rather than in Egyptian—with its hieroglyphic and demotic scripts—was a fortuitous one. This choice ensured that his work could be read not just in his own Hellenistic world, but that it would remain accessible long after the ancient Egyptian language and its writing systems had fallen into disuse by the fifth century CE.

For centuries before the decipherment of ancient Egyptian scripts, the surviving fragments of the Aegyptiaca served as the main textual basis for understanding the sequence of Egyptian rulers, forming a critical foundation for early Egyptological scholarship. Notably, Jean-François Champollion relied on its king-lists as a key to his pioneering translation of those scripts.

Despite its fragmentary state, the Aegyptiaca has allowed scholars from classical and late antiquity through the modern era to encounter Egypt's ancient history. As a native educated Egyptian who wrote for a foreign audience, Manetho, through his Aegyptiaca, offered a unique perspective on Egypt's deep past and its new place in a changing world.

== See also ==
- Chronicon (Eusebius)
- Excerpta Latina Barbari
- Hecataeus of Abdera
- Osarseph
