= Hecataeus of Abdera =

Greek philosopher and historian (c. 360 – c. 290 BC)

Hecataeus of Abdera (Greek: Ἑκαταῖος ὁ Ἀβδηρίτης; c. 360 BCE – c. 290 BCE) was an ancient Greek historian and ethnographer. None of his works survive; his writings are attested by later authors in various literary fragments, in particular his Aegyptica, a work on the society and culture of the Egyptians, and On the Hyperboreans. He is one of the authors (FGrHist 264) whose fragments were collected in Felix Jacoby's Fragmente der griechischen Historiker.

Historian John Dillery called Hecataeus "a figure of extraordinary importance for the study of Greek and non-Greek [cultures] in the Hellenistic period."

== Life ==
Hecataeus was generally associated with Abdera (Gr: Ἄβδηρα), a Greek colony on the coast of Thrace near the mouth of the Néstos River.

Diodorus Siculus (fl. 1st century BCE) wrote that Hecataeus visited Thebes in the times of Ptolemy I Soter (r. 305 – 282 BCE) and composed a history of Egypt. Diodorus comments that many additional Greeks went to and wrote about Egypt in the same period. The 10th-century Byzantine encyclopedia the Suda gives him the honorific title "critic grammarian" and says that he lived in the time of the successors to Alexander. According to 3rd-century CE philosopher Diogenes Laertius, Hecataeus was a student of the skeptic Pyrrho (c. 360 – 270 BCE).

== Works ==
No complete works of Hecataeus have survived, and knowledge of his writing exists only in passages (called "fragments") from works by other ancient writers, most of which concern religion. Eight fragments survive from his book about the Hyperboreans, the mythical people of the far north. Six fragments survive from his Aegyptiaca and regard Egyptian philosophy, priests, gods, sanctuaries, Moses, and wine; they also mention the 4th century BCE Greek philosopher Clearchus of Soli and the school of gymnosophists. Hecataeus wrote the work Aegyptiaca (c. 320 – 305 BCE) or On the Egyptians. Both suggestions are based on known titles of other ethnographic works which contain an account of Egypt's customs, religious beliefs and geography. The single largest fragment from this lost work is held to be Diodorus' account of the Ramesseum, the tomb of Ramesses II, who is often referred to by the Greek rendition of his name, Ozymandias (i.47-50). According to Montanari, in Hecataeus's writing, Egypt is "strongly idealised" and depicted as a country "exemplary in its customs and political institutions". Hecataeus' excursus on the Jews in Aegyptiaca was the first mention of them in ancient Greek literature. It was subsequently paraphrased in Diodorus Siculus 40.3.8.

Diodorus Siculus' ethnography of Egypt (Bibliotheca historica, Book I) represents by far the largest number of fragments. Diodorus mostly paraphrases Hecataeus, thus it is difficult to extract Hecataeus's actual writings (as in Karl Wilhelm Ludwig Müller's Fragmenta Historicorum Graecorum). Diodorus (ii.47.1-2) and Apollonius of Rhodes tell of another work by Hecataeus, On the Hyperboreans. The early Christian theologian Clement of Alexandria (c. 150 – c. 215 CE) (Stromata 5.113) cites a work by Hecataeus entitled "On Abraham and the Egyptians". According to Clement, Hecataeus was his source of verses from Sophocles that praise monotheism and condemn idolatry. The main fragment explicitly attributed to Hecataeus in Jewish and Christian literature is found in Josephus (Apion 1.175–205), who argues in this fragment that learned Greeks (including Aristotle) admired the Jews. The work is considered spurious in the Oxford Classical Dictionary, and, according to Brill's New Pauly, its author was probably a Hellenised Jew.

According to the 10th century Byzantine encyclopedia the Suda, Hecataeus wrote a treatise on Homer and Hesiod, entitled On the Poetry of Homer and Hesiod (Περὶ τῆς ποιήσεως Ὁμήρου καὶ Ἡσιόδου). Nothing of this work survives, however, and it is mentioned by no other ancient source.
