= Karl Wilhelm Ludwig Müller =

German philologist and historian (1813–1894)

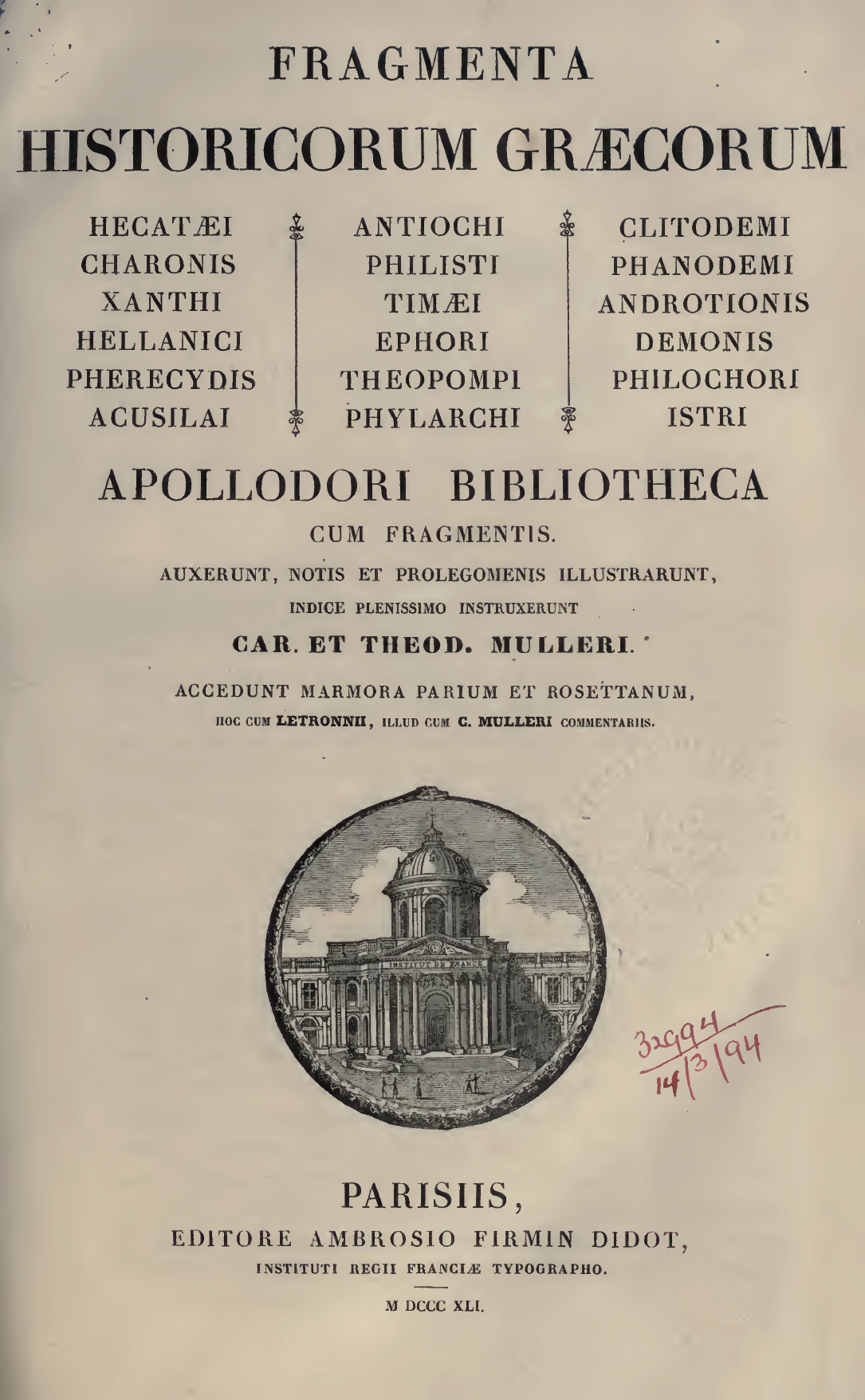
The title page of the Fragmenta Historicorum Graecorum's first volume, published in 1841

Karl Wilhelm Ludwig Müller (Latin: Carolus Müllerus; 13 February 1813 in Clausthal – 1894 in Göttingen) was a German philologist and historian, best known for his Didot editions of fragmentary Greek authors.

== Fragmenta Historicorum Graecorum ==
Müller's monumental Fragmenta Historicorum Graecorum (FHG), the first major collection of fragments from Greek historians, was published across five volumes between 1841 and 1870. The FHG compiles the fragments of precisely 636 such historians, who date from between the 6th century BC and the 7th century AD, and are ordered chronologically within the collection. (Note: Berti, p. 261. This chronological ordering is followed in all of the volumes except the first.) The fragments of each historian are ordered according to the work to which they were attributed, and are accompanied by a Latin translation and commentary. Müller's research in preparing the collection, which had originally been planned as a single-volume work, was funded by François-Ambroise Didot. The work was replaced as the preeminent edition of the fragmentary Greek historians by Die Fragmente der griechischen Historiker (FGrHist), which was started in the 20th century by Felix Jacoby, and has recently been expanded. In the 21st century, the FHG has been digitised as the Digital Fragmenta Historicorum Graecorum.

== Works ==
- De Aeschyli Septem Contra Thebas, Diss. Göttingen (1836): Internet Archive. OCLC 1042940183.
- Fragmenta Historicorum Graecorum (1841–1870): vols. 1, 2, 3, 4, 5. OCLC 697766963.
- Arriani Anabasis et Indica. Scriptores rerum Alexandri Magni (fragmenta). Pseudo-Callisthenes (1846): online
- Oratores Attici (1847–1858): vols. 1–2
- Strabonis Geographica (1853): online
- Herodoti Historiarum libri ix. Ctesiae Cnidii et Chronographorum Castoris Eratosthenis etc. fragmenta (1858): online
- Geographi Graeci minores (1861–1882): vol. 1, vol. 2, tabulae
- Claudii Ptolemaei Geographia (1883–1901): vol. 1:1, vol. 1:2
