= Periodization of ancient Egypt =

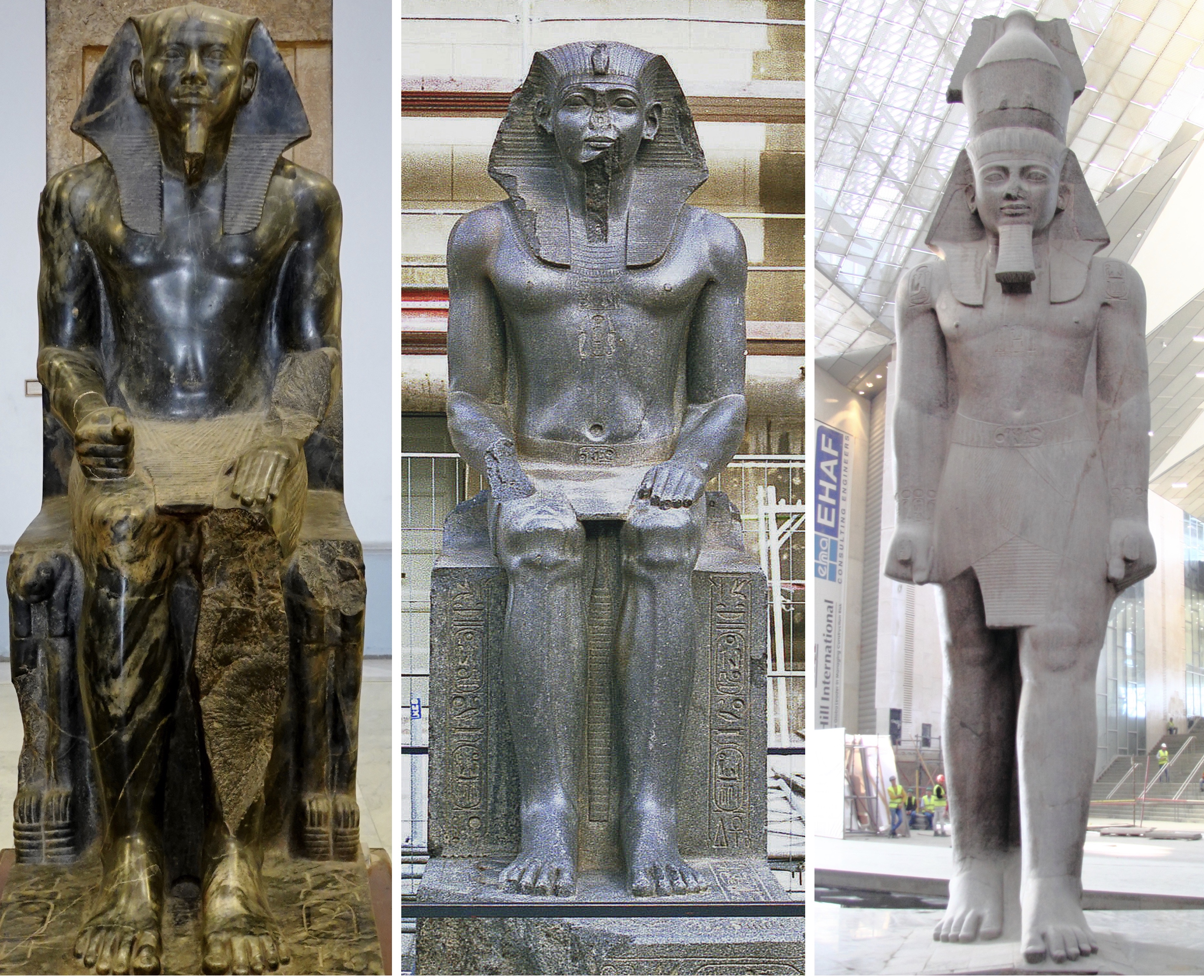
Three colossal statues. Left: Khafre Enthroned from the Old Kingdom, Center: Statue of Amenemhat II from the Middle Kingdom, Right: Statue of Ramesses II from the New Kingdom.

The periodization of ancient Egypt is the use of periodization to organize the 3,000-year history of ancient Egypt. The system of 30 dynasties recorded by the third-century BC Greek-speaking Egyptian priest Manetho is still in use today; however, the system of "periods" and "kingdoms" used to group the dynasties is of modern origin (19th and 20th centuries CE). The modern system consists of three "Golden Ages" (Old, Middle, and New Kingdoms), interspersed with "intermediate periods" (often, though not always, considered times of crisis or Dark Ages) and early and late periods.

== Old, Middle and New Kingdoms ==
=== Bunsen ===
In his 1844–1857 Ägyptens Stelle in der Weltgeschichte, Christian Charles Josias von Bunsen became the first Egyptologist to propose what became the modern tripartite division for Egypt's history:

- Altes Reich ("Old Empire") = Menes until the beginning of the 13th Dynasty
- Mittleres Reich ("Middle Empire") = Hyksos until the 17th Dynasty
- Neues Reich ("New Empire") = from the 18th Dynasty onward

Bunsen explained, in the English translation of his 1844 work, how he came to derive the three Kingdoms:

In 1834 I discovered in the list of Eratosthenes the key to the restoration of the first 12 Dynasties of Manetho, and was thereby enabled to fix the length of the Old Empire. These two points being settled, the next step obviously was, to fill up the chasm between the Old and New Empires, which is commonly called the Hyksos Period ... I have been fully convinced ever since my first restoration (in 1834) of the three Egyptian Empires, the middle one of which embraces the time of the Hyksos, that the 12th Dynasty of Manetho was the last complete one of the Old Empire, and that the throne of the Memphitic Pharaohs, according to the connection which that restoration enabled me to establish between Manetho and Eratosthenes, passed with the 4th King of the 13th Dynasty over to the Shepherd-Kings.

Compared to the modern arrangement, Bunsen's Old Empire included what is today known as the Middle Kingdom, whereas Bunsen's Middle Empire is today known as the Second Intermediate Period.

=== Lepsius ===
Bunsen's student Karl Richard Lepsius primarily used a bipartite system in his 1849–1858 Denkmäler aus Ägypten und Äthiopien:

- Altes Reich = dynasties 1–16
- Neues Reich = dynasties 17–31

=== Other scholars ===
Auguste Mariette's 1867 Aperçu de l'histoire ancienne d'Égypte:

- Old Kingdom = Dynasties 1–10
- Middle Kingdom = Dynasties 11–17
- New Kingdom = Dynasties 18–30

Alfred Wiedemann's Ägyptische Geschichte:

- Prehistory = Dynasties 1–11
- Middle Kingdom = Dynasties 12–19
- New Kingdom = Dynasties 20–31

Henri Gauthier's 1907–1917 Le Livre des Rois d'Egypte:

- Ancien Empire ("Ancient Empire") = Dynasties 1–10
- Moyen Empire ("Middle Empire")= Dynasties 11–17
- Nouvel Empire ("New Empire") = Dynasties 17–25
- Époque saïto-persane ("Saito-Persian period") = Dynasties 26–31
- Époque macédo-grecque ("Macedonian–Greek period") = Dynasties 32 (Macedonian) and 33 (Ptolemaic)

== Intermediate periods ==
=== First Intermediate Period ===
19th-century Egyptology did not use the concept of "intermediate periods"; these were included as part of the preceding periods "as times of interval or transition".

In 1926, after the First World War, Georg Steindorff's Die Blütezeit des Pharaonenreiches and Henri Frankfort's Egypt and Syria in the First Intermediate Period assigned dynasties 6–12 to the terminology "First Intermediate Period". The terminology had become well established by the 1940s.

=== Second Intermediate Period ===
In 1942, during the Second World War, German Egyptologist Hanns Stock's Studien zur Geschichte und Archäologie der 13. bis 17. Dynastie fostered use of the term "Second Intermediate Period".

=== Third Intermediate Period ===
In 1978, British Egyptologist Kenneth Kitchen's book The Third Intermediate Period in Egypt (1100–650 BC) coined the term "Third Intermediate Period".

== Bibliography ==
- Schneider, Thomas (27 August 2008). "Periodizing Egyptian History: Manetho, Convention, and Beyond". In Klaus-Peter Adam (ed.). Historiographie in der Antike. Walter de Gruyter. pp. 181–197. ISBN 978-3-11-020672-2.
- Clayton, Peter A. (1994). Chronicle of the Pharaohs. London: Thames and Hudson. ISBN 978-0-500-05074-3.
