= Willy Theiler =

Swiss classical philologist (1899–1977)

Willy Theiler FBA
- Born: Max Wilhelm Theiler; 24 October 1899; Adliswil, Switzerland
- Died: 26 February 1977 (aged 77); Bern, Switzerland

Academic background
- Education: University of Basel

Academic work
- Institutions: Kiel University; University of Königsberg; University of Bern

Max Wilhelm Theiler (24 October 1899 – 26 February 1977) was a Swiss classical philologist who specialized in ancient philosophy.

Born in Adliswil, Theiler was the son of Gottfried Theiler and d'Emma Weidmann. He was educated at the universities of Zurich, Basel, Göttingen, and Berlin. He obtained his doctorate from Basel in 1924, He was appointed Privatdozent in 1927, extraordinary professor at Kiel University in 1930, ordinary professor at Königsberg University in 1932, extraordinary (1944), then ordinary professor (1947–1968) of philology at Bern. He died in Bern.

Theiler was elected a corresponding fellow of the British Academy in 1965.
