= William Gillan Waddell =

Scottish Professor of Classics at what is now Cairo University

- Born: 21 April 1884
- Died: 25 January 1945 (aged 60)

Academic background
- Education: University of Glasgow

Academic work
- Discipline: classics
- Institutions: Fuad el Awal University
- Main interests: translation of ancient Greek and Latin

William Gillan Waddell (21 April 1884 – 25 January 1945) was a Scottish Professor of Classics at what is now Cairo University.

== Life ==
Waddell was born in Neilston, Scotland. In 1906 he obtained his M.A. from the University of Glasgow. He was Professor of Classics at Fuad el Awal University in Cairo, Egypt (in 1940). Waddell was a translator of ancient Greek and Latin into English.

== Selected works ==
- Menander, of Athens; W G Waddell (1927). Selections from Menander. Oxford, Clarendon Press. OCLC 5329253.
- W G Waddell (1932). The lighter side of the Greek papyri: a talk to the St. Andrew's society, Cairo, Egypt. [Low Fell near Newcastle upon Tyne] : [C.F. Cutter]. OCLC 4145247.
- Herodotus; W G Waddell (1939). Herodotus, book II. Methuen's classical texts. London, Methuen & Co. OCLC 9272920.
- Manetho; Ptolemy; W G Waddell (1940). Manetho. Loeb classical library. Vol. 350. Cambridge, Mass., Harvard University Press; London, W. Heinemann Ltd. ISBN 9780674993853. OCLC 690604.
