= Felix Jacoby =

German classicist and philologist (1876–1959)

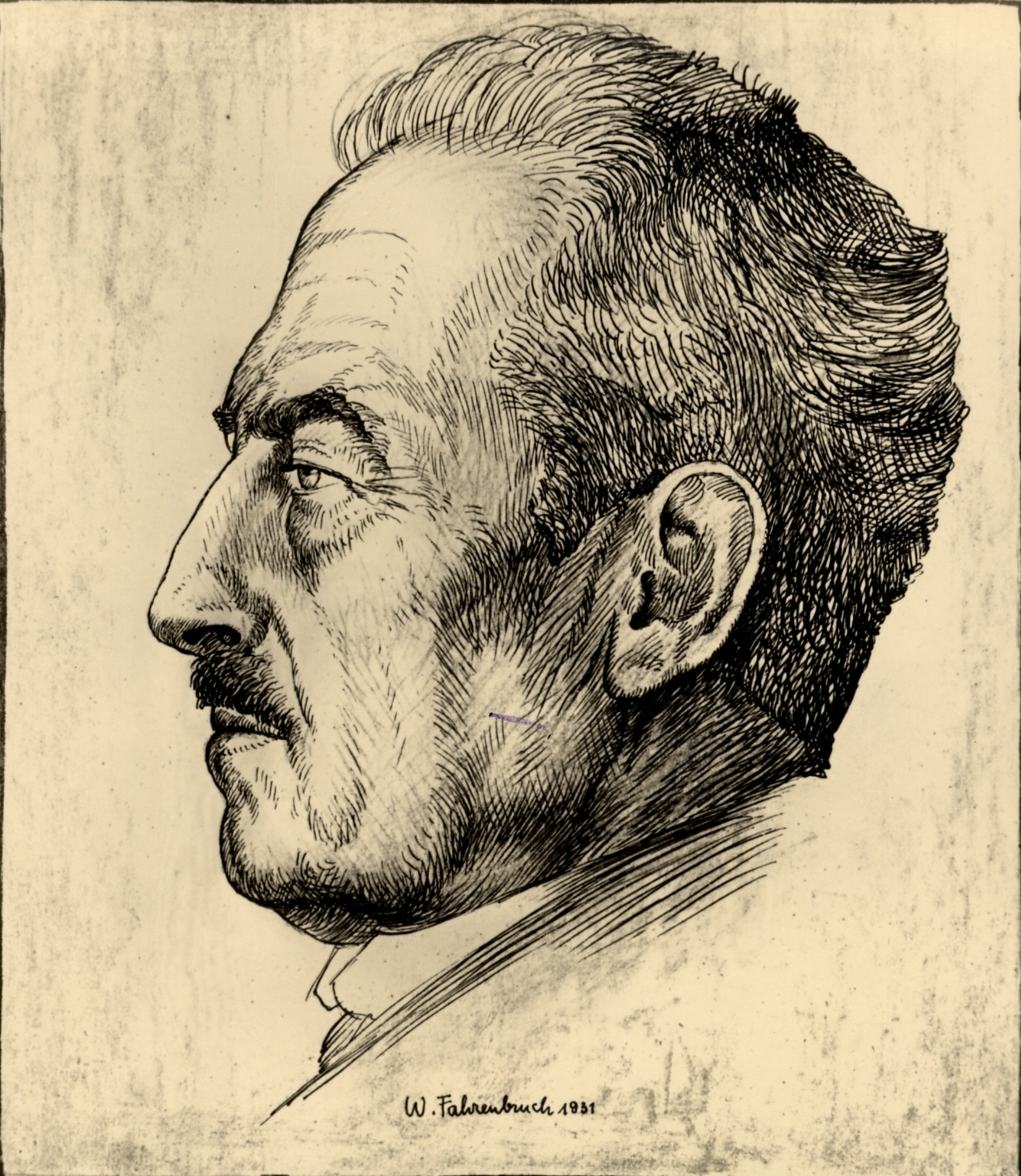
- Jacoby in 1931
- Born: 19 March 1876; Magdeburg, Province of Saxony
- Died: 10 November 1959 (aged 83); West Berlin, West Germany
- Education: University of Berlin
- Known for: Fragmente der griechischen Historiker
- Scientific career
- Fields: Classical studies
- Workplaces: University of Kiel; Oxford University
- Doctoral advisor: Hermann Diels
- Other academic advisors: Eduard Norden; Ulrich von Wilamowitz-Moellendorff

Felix Jacoby (German: [jaˈkoːbi]; 19 March 1876 – 10 November 1959) was a German classicist and philologist. He is best known among classicists for his highly important work Fragmente der griechischen Historiker, a collection of text fragments of ancient Greek historians.

== Biography ==
Jacoby was born in Magdeburg to Jewish parents. There he attended the grammar school at the monastery of Unser Lieben Frauen (Our Dear Lady) in Magdeburg and was baptised a Protestant in St John's Church at the age of 11.

From 1906 to 1934, he was professor of classics at Kiel. Though he was later expelled from the University of Kiel during the Gleichschaltung of Nazi Germany, Jacoby is said by some to have been one of a very small number of German Jews who initially supported Adolf Hitler. According to some witnesses, he even went so far as to make the startling comparison in 1933:

As a Jew I find myself in a difficult position. But as a historian I have long learned not to view historical events from a private perspective. I have voted for Adolf Hitler since 1927 and I am happy that in the year of the National Rising I am allowed to lecture on Augustus, because Augustus is the only figure in world history that may be compared to Adolf Hitler.

However, others doubt that this is true. In 1939, Jacoby fled to England, where he stayed at Oxford, continuing his work on the fragments of the Greek historians. He returned to Germany in 1956, and died in Berlin in 1959.

He is best known among classicists for his highly important work Fragmente der griechischen Historiker, a collection of text fragments of ancient Greek historians. Also significant is his long entry in the Realencyclopädie der Classischen Altertumswissenschaft on the Greek historian Herodotus; written in 1913, this article established many of the questions that would come to dominate modern Herodotean scholarship.

== Bibliography ==
- Ampolo, Carmine, ed. (2006). Aspetti dell' opera di Felix Jacoby (in Italian). Pisa: Scuola Normale Superiore. ISBN 978-88-7642-179-2.
- Chambers, Mortimer (1990). "Felix Jacoby". In Briggs, Ward W.; Calder III, William M. (eds.). Classical Scholarship. A Biographical Encyclopedia. New York / London: Garland Publishing, Inc. pp. 205–210. ISBN 978-0-8240-8448-6.
- Mensching, Eckart (2003). "Finkenkrug, Neuseeland und Oxford. Über Felix Jacoby und seine Familie 1938/39". Nugae zur Philologie-Geschichte (in German). Vol. XIII. Berlin: Universitätsbibliothek der Technischen Universität Berlin. pp. 42–53.
- Theiler, Willy (1960). "Felix Jacoby†". Gnomon (in German). 32 (4): 387–391. ISSN 0017-1417. JSTOR 27682301.
- Wittram, Annegret (2004). Fragmenta. Felix Jacoby und Kiel: ein Beitrag zur Geschichte der Kieler Christian-Albrechts-Universität (in German). Frankfurt am Main: Peter Lang. ISBN 978-3-631-52365-0.
