= Fragmente der griechischen Historiker =

Book by Felix Jacoby

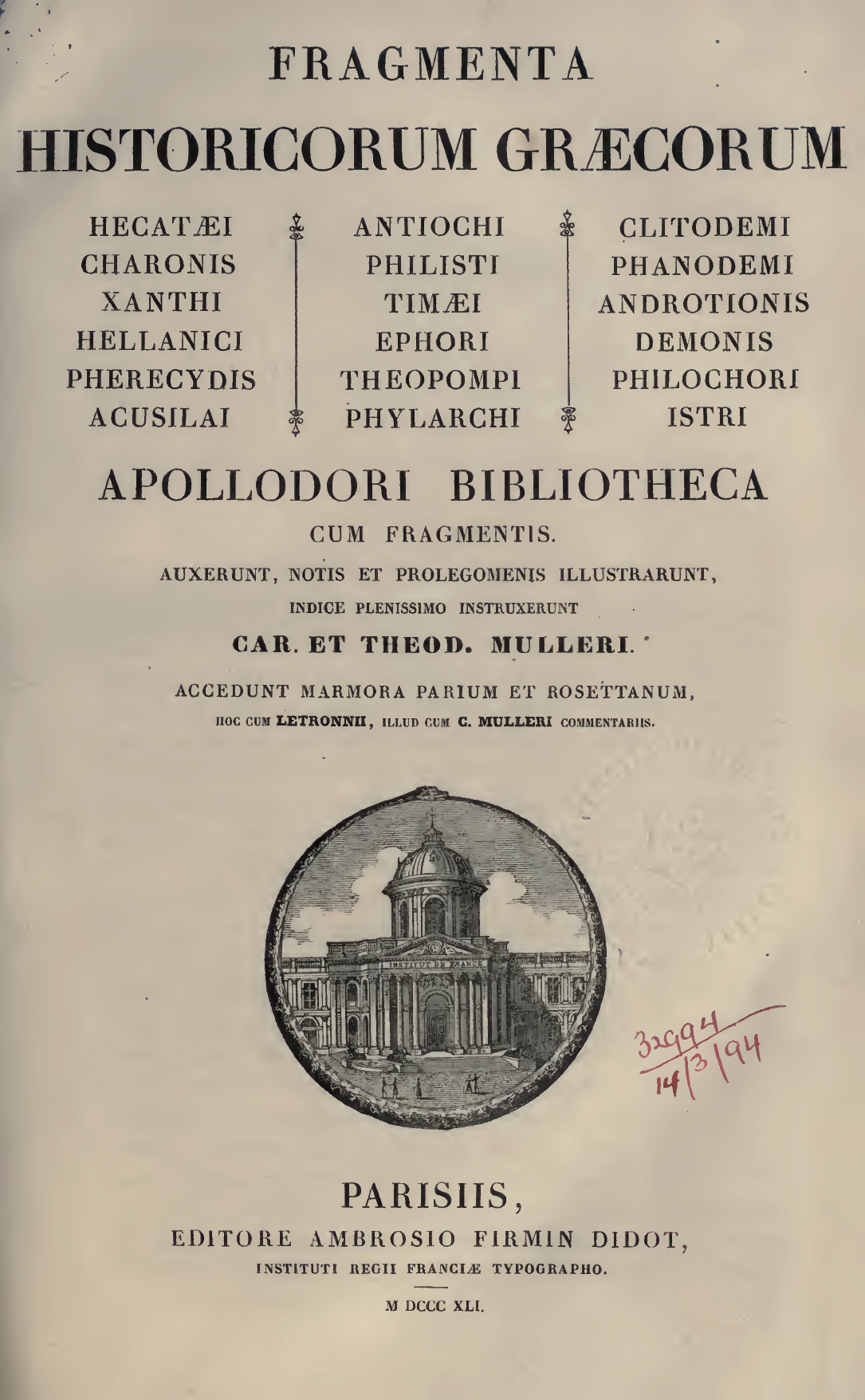
First edition of Fragmenta historicorum Graecorum, vol. 1.

Die Fragmente der griechischen Historiker, commonly abbreviated FGrHist or FGrH (Fragments of the Greek Historians), is a collection by Felix Jacoby of the works of those ancient Greek historians whose works have been lost, but of which we have citations, extracts or summaries. It is mainly founded on Karl Wilhelm Ludwig Müller's previous Fragmenta Historicorum Graecorum (1841–1870).

The work was started in 1923 and continued by him till his death in 1959. The project was divided into six parts, of which only the first three were published. The first included the mythographers and the most ancient historians (authors 1-63); the second, the historians proper (authors 64–261); the third, the autobiographies, local histories and works on foreign countries (authors 262-856). Parts I-III come to fifteen volumes, but Jacoby never got to write part IV (biography and antiquarian literature) and V (historical geography). A pool of editors is currently trying to complete this task (Die Fragmente der griechischen Historiker. Continued); 200+ new entries have been published online so far (in English, German, French and Italian), with editions in print following for part IV. Meanwhile a new English-language edition of Jacoby's original work (parts I-III) has also been published online, Brill's New Jacoby (BNJ), with a completely new commentary, providing English translations of all fragments and an updated bibliography. (Note: Both new publications can be found online, together with Jacoby's original German work, at Brill's website.)

== Volume index ==
- Felix Jacoby: Die Fragmente der griechischen Historiker. (FGrHist) Weidmann, Berlin 1923ff. OCLC 19475725.
  - Teil 1, Genealogie und Mythographie. - A. Vorrede, Text, Addenda, Konkordanz [Nr. 1 - 63], Weidmann, Berlin 1923; Neudr. verm. um Addenda zum Text, Nachtr. zum Kommentar, Corrigenda u. Konkordanz. Brill, Leiden 1957.
  - Teil 2, Zeitgeschichte. - A. Universalgeschichte und Hellenika [Nr. 64-105], Weidmann, Berlin, 1926.
  - Teil 2, Zeitgeschichte. - B. Spezialgeschichten, Autobiographien und Memoiren, Zeittafeln [Nr. 106-261], Weidmann, Berlin 1926-1930.
  - Teil 2, Zeitgeschichte. - C. Kommentar zu Nr. 64 – 105. Weidmann, Berlin 1926.
  - Teil 2, Zeitgeschichte. - D. Kommentar zu Nr. 106 – 261. Weidmann, Berlin 1930.
  - Teil 3, Geschichte von Staedten und Voelkern (Horographie und Ethnographie). - A. Autoren ueber verschiedene Staedte (Laender) [Nr. 262-296]. Brill, Leiden, 1940.
  - Teil 3, Geschichte von Staedten und Voelkern (Horographie und Ethnographie). - A. Kommentar zu Nr. 262 – 296. Brill, Leiden 1943.
  - Teil 3, Geschichte von Staedten und Voelkern (Horographie und Ethnographie). - B. Autoren ueber einzelne Staedte (Laender) [Nr. 297 – 607]. Brill, Leiden, 1954.
  - Teil 3, Geschichte von Staedten und Voelkern. - B (Suppl.), A commentary on the ancient historians of Athens. - Vol. 1. Text. Brill, Leiden, 1954.
  - Teil 3, Geschichte von Staedten und Voelkern. - B (Suppl.), A commentary on the ancient historians of Athens. - Vol. 2. Notes, Addenda, Corrigenda, Index. Brill, Leiden 1954.
  - Teil 3, Geschichte von Staedten und Voelkern. - B, Autoren ueber einzelne Laender - Kommentar zu Nr. 297 - 607. Text – Noten. Brill, Leiden, 1955.
  - Teil 3, Geschichte von Staedten und Voelkern. - C, Autoren ueber einzelne Laender. - Bd. 1. Aegypten - Geten [Nr. 608a – 708]. Leiden, Brill, 1958
  - Teil 3, Geschichte von Staedten und Voelkern. - C, Autoren ueber einzelne Laender. - Bd. 2. Illyrien - Thrakien [Nr. 709 – 856]. Brill, Leiden, 1958.
  - Teil 3, Geschichte von Staedten und Voelkern. – C, fasc. 1. Commentary on nos. 608a – 608. Brill, Leiden, 1994. (von Charles W. Fornara)
- Felix Jacoby: Die Fragmente der griechischen Historiker continued.
  - Part 4, Biography and antiquarian literature. – A, Biography. - Fasc. 1. The pre-Hellenistic period [1000 – 1013]. Brill, Leiden, 1998. (von Jan Bollansé u. a.)
  - Part 4, Biography and antiquarian literature. – A, Biography. - Fasc. 3. Hermippos of Smyrna [1026]. Brill, Leiden, 1999 (von Jan Bollansé).
  - Part 4, Biography and antiquarian literature. – A, Biography. - Fasc. 7. Imperial and undated authors [1053 – 1118]. Brill, Leiden, 1999. (von Jan Radicke)
  - Part 4, Biography and antiquarian literature. – A, Biography. - Fasc. 8. Anonymous papyri [1119-1139]. Brill, Leiden, 2019.(James H. Brusuelas, Dirk Obbink, Stefan Schorn)
  - Part 4, Biography and antiquarian literature. – B, History of literature, music, art and culture. – Fasc. 9. Dikaiarchos of Messene [1400]. Brill, Leiden, 2018. (Gertjan Verhasselt)
- Index: Jacoby Die Fragmente der griechischen Historiker : Indexes of Parts I, II, and III: Indexes of ancient authors (1. Introduction, alphabetical list of authors conserving testimonia & fragments. – 2. Concordance Jacoby – source. - - 3. Alphabetical list of fragmentary historians with alphabetical list of source-authors for each). Brill, Leiden, 1999. (Pierre Bonnechere OCLC 43072091.
- Planned Continuation Volumes:
  - IV B. History of Literature, Music, Art and Culture (and related genres)
  - IV C. Politeiai, Nomoi, Nomima, On Cities, On Islands, Ktiseis, Aitia (and related genres)
  - IV C 1. Politeiai, Nomoi and Nomima
  - IV C 2. On Cities, On Islands, Ktiseis, Aitia (and related genres)
  - IV C 3. Kallimachos
  - IV D. History of Religion and Cult
  - IV E. Paradoxography
  - IV F. Collections, Anthologies and Hypomnemata (and related genres)
