= Literary fragment =

Genre or piece of a larger work

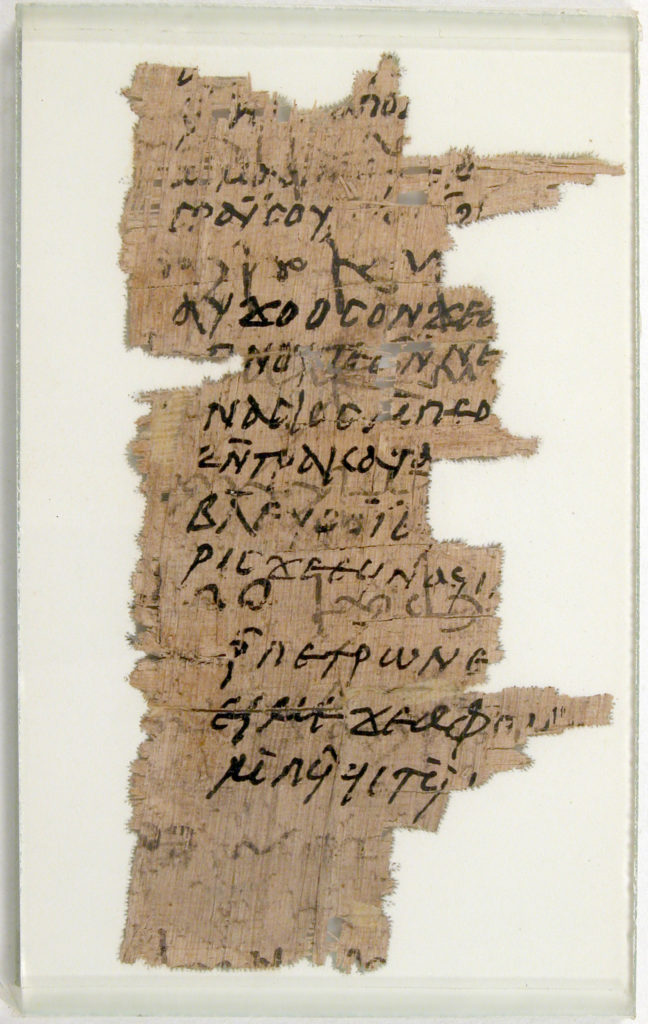
Byzantine Egyptian papyrus fragment

A literary fragment is a piece of text that may be part of a larger work, or that employs a 'fragmentary' form characterised by physical features such as short paragraphs or sentences separated by white space, and thematic features such as discontinuity, ambivalence, ambiguity, or lack of a traditional narrative structure.

While it is difficult to classify literary fragments, a number of critics agree on a basic taxonomy of two types of fragment: those who intentionally use fragmentation as a form in their writing, and those that are fragmented because they are incomplete or because parts have been lost over time.

As a form, the literary fragment has been employed during the Romantic, Modernist, Postmodern and Contemporary literary periods as a way to reckon with the challenges of modernity.

== Criticism and theory ==
The literary fragment and the concept of fragmentariness presents several challenges to literary criticism, in part because of the difficulty in determining what constitutes a fragment. Guignery and Drag write that the task of defining the literary fragment is "near-impossible". Sophie Thomas writes that literary fragments "disturb characterization", as they exist somewhere between a part and a whole but do not belong to either. Others, such as Hans-Jost Frey, suggest that the fragment may be entirely incompatible with literary theory because it is by nature "hostile to meaning", and defies the boundaries and borders upon which theory depends.

The difficulty in defining the literary fragment is also due to the connotations of the word 'fragment' and its relationship to archaeology; while a fragment of pottery can suggest the part that was lost due to the nature of patterning, the literary fragment cannot represent its whole in the same way, which complicates the relationship between the literary fragment and its suggested whole.

== Literary fragments of larger works ==
The discovery of fragments of larger works has been of interest to scholars in many fields since at least the sixteenth century, and has formed the research basis of many fields since the establishment of academic disciplines in the nineteenth century. Historical literary fragments are studied closely in the fields of papyrology, which involves the study of papyrus texts almost all preserved in fragments, and the more recently established field of fragmentology, which involves the study of surviving fragments of mostly medieval European manuscripts.

Historical literary fragments include the remains of works otherwise lost over time, such as in the case of the poetry of Sappho, as well as quotations in secondary texts from works that have never been discovered, such as in the work of Heraclitus.

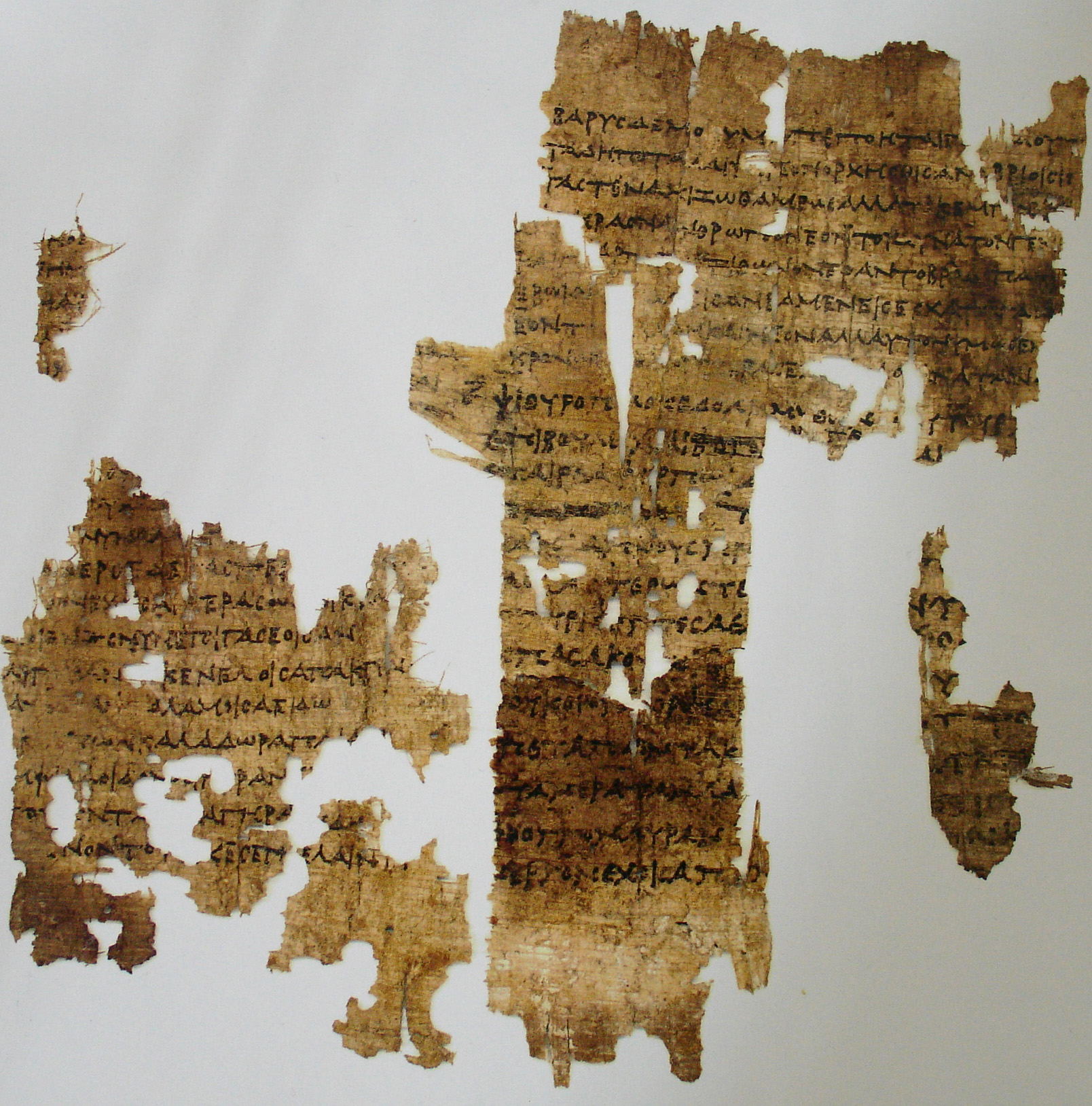
Fragment of the Tithonus poem by Greek poet Sappho, third century BCE.

=== Notable examples ===
Notable examples of writers of extant fragments of longer works include Sappho, Heraclitus, Sophocles, Xenophon, Antisthenes, Abydenus, Berossus, Sanchoniatho and Megasthenes.

=== Further reading ===
- Fragmente der griechischen Historiker
- The Fragmentarium
- Digital Fragmenta Historicum Graecorum

== Literary fragments as a form ==
=== Romantic period ===
The fragment as both theme and form is strongly associated with European Romanticism. While the Romantic fragment evolved out of the much earlier writings of Montaigne, Pascal and the English and French moralist tradition, scholars note that the fragmentary form was established by a group of German writers associated with the Jena school including Friedrich Schlegel and Novalis. The Jena Romantics, as well as Goethe, Nietzsche, Schiller and Walter Benjamin, saw the fragment as a literary form that offered freedom from the limitations imposed by traditional genres, had the potential to reject Enlightenment ways of thinking, and could reflect the fragmentary nature of existence while gesturing towards the future. According to Jean-Luc Nancy and Philippe Lacoue-Lebarthe, the Romantic "aims at fragmentation for its own sake".

This idea is also reflected in the work of the English late-Romantic poets who saw the potential of the fragmented form to express insights "that went beyond established forms and genres".

The historical fragment and the motif of the historical ruin also gained popularity during this period, with many writers taking inspiration from recently discovered relics of the past. This interest in historical fragments saw several literary hoaxes in which Romantic writers including Thomas Chatterton and James Macpherson claimed to have translated or discovered historical fragments that were later shown to be their own modern creation.

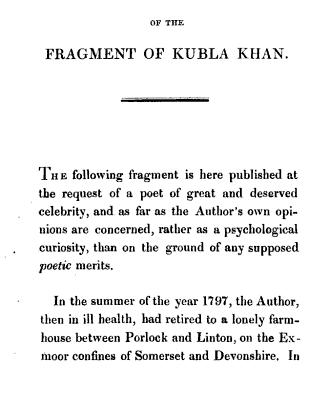
Samuel Taylor Coleridge, Kubla Khan: Or A Vision in a Dream

==== Notable examples ====
Notable examples of authors that produced fragmentary work in the Romantic period include Samuel Taylor Coleridge, John Keats, Lord Byron and Percy Bysshe Shelley.

=== Modernist period ===
The use of the fragment as a form is closely linked to the modernist literary tradition. As Nora Golschmidt explains, "the fragment is so integral to the literary and visual cultures of modernism that it borders on cliche."

The modernist literary movement is often described as being a repudiation of earlier ideas, but many note that modernist fragmentary writing was a clear response to the Romantic fragment poem. While the Romantics saw the fragment as a way to reckon with ideas of possibility and limitlessness, the fragment that appeared during this period in the first half of the twentieth century was a response to the challenges of modernity. As John Tytell explains, the fragment became synonymous with literary modernism because it represented "a new sense of the universe that began to emerge as the nineteenth century ended". Industrialisation, technological advancement and developments in science all lead to significant societal changes, and the First World War "seemed to sever any reliable continuities with the values of the past", leading to a "fragmented experience of modernity". These changes prompted writers to seek a new mode of representation that could represent the complexity of the modern world.

According to Gasiorek, the modernist period saw the literary fragment become part of the novel, the genre previously considered the least consistent with fragmentation. He explains that the modernists adopted the fragment as a rejection of realism that was seen as an "unwarrantedly stable and epistemologically confident narrative mode", and instead,

developed novelistic forms that were fragmented, deployed multiple viewpoints, emphasised the subjective nature of experience, disrupted narrative chronology, drew attention to the fictive nature of their narrative procedures, experimented with language, and, by refusing the comforts of closure, remained steadfastly open‐ended.

==== Notable examples ====
Notable examples of authors that produced fragmentary work in the Modernist period include T. S. Eliot, Gertrude Stein, Virginia Woolf, James Joyce, and Ezra Pound.

=== Postmodern period ===
The postmodern period saw a renewed focus on the literary fragment as a rejection of traditional narrative modes, leading Paul Virilio to label the period as "the age of micro-narrative, the art of the fragment". While the modernists saw the fragment as a way of making sense of the chaos of the modernising world and searching for unity in a disjointed world, the postmodern period saw writers "give up Modernist attempts to restore wholeness to a fragmented world", dispensing with the notion of over-arching meaning, instead representing the world as fundamentally fractured and disordered.

The postmodern literary fragment is characterised by mosaic, montage, collage, polyphonic narrative and voices, multiple perspectives, pastiche, duplication, mirroring, and incompletion. Douwe Fokkema writes that the Postmodern fragment emphasises discontinuity and destroys connectivity, explaining that "many Postmodernist texts are a collection of relatively unconnected fragments, which challenge the literary code that predisposes the reader to look for coherence."

==== Notable examples ====
Notable examples of authors that produced fragmentary work in the Postmodern period include William S. Burroughs, Kathy Acker, Donald Barthelme, John Barth, B.S. Johnson and Robert Coover.

=== Contemporary period ===
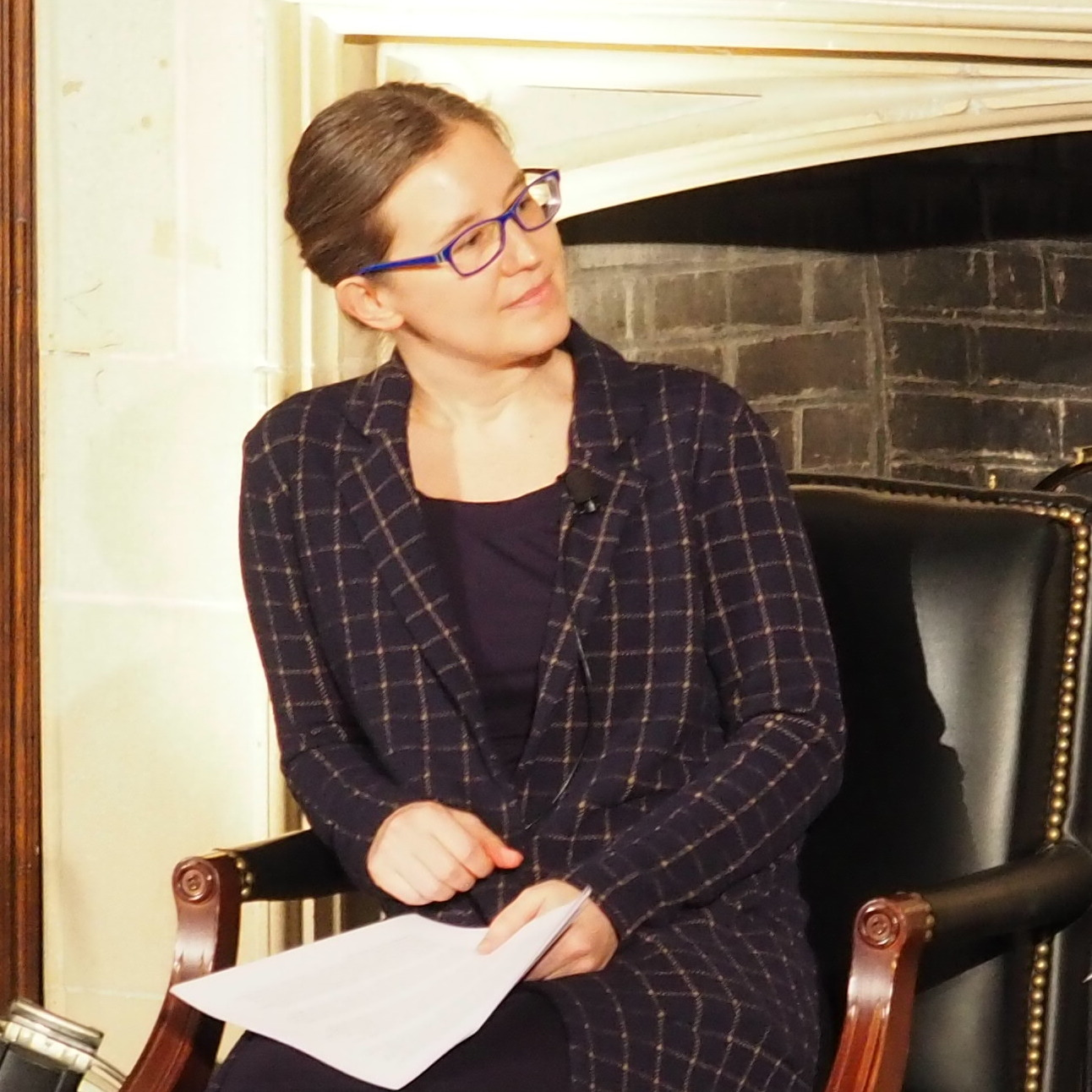
Eula Biss, 2019

The contemporary period has seen an increase in the prevalence of fragmentation in works of literature. Wojciech Drąg notes that this period has seen a revival of fragmentary writing that poses a new kind of challenge for the reader, as it rejects narrative conventions and conventional novelistic structures, favours non-linearity, experimentation with chronology, metatextuality, repetition, listing and the use of citations in creative works.

Critics such as Shannon Callaghan note that the contemporary fragment offers a new way of representing marginalised identities and traumatic experiences outside of traditional narrative structures. Guignery and Drag note that the contemporary fragment might also be a response to the "accelerated culture of social media and overcommunication within which long-form fiction seems increasingly anachronistic."

==== Notable examples ====
Notable examples of authors producing fragmented work in the Contemporary period include Mark Z. Danielewski, Maggie Nelson, David Shields, Jenny Offill, Jenny Boully, Anne Carson, Jonathan Safran Foer, Eula Biss, Kate Zambreno, Ali Smith, J. M. Coetzee and David Mitchell.
