= Solar calendar =

Calendar based on the seasons or apparent sun position

A solar calendar is a calendar whose dates indicates the season or almost equivalently the apparent position of the Sun relative to the stars. The Gregorian calendar, widely accepted as a standard in the world, is an example of a solar calendar. The main other types of calendar are lunar calendar and lunisolar calendar, whose months correspond to cycles of Moon phases. The months of the Gregorian calendar do not correspond to cycles of the Moon phase.

The Egyptians appear to have been the first to develop a solar calendar, using as a fixed point the annual sunrise reappearance of the Dog Star—Sirius, or Sothis—in the eastern sky, which coincided with the annual flooding of the Nile River. They constructed a calendar of 365 days, consisting of 12 months of 30 days each, with 5 days added at the year’s end. The Egyptians’ failure to account for the extra fraction of a day, however, caused their calendar to drift gradually into error.

== Examples ==
The oldest solar calendars include the Julian calendar and the Coptic calendar. They both have a year of 365 days, which is extended to 366 once every four years, without exception, so have a mean year of 365.25 days. As solar calendars became more accurate, they evolved into two types.

=== Tropical solar calendars ===
If the position of the Earth in its orbit around the Sun is reckoned with respect to the Equinox, the point at which the orbit crosses the celestial equator, then its dates accurately indicate the seasons, that is, they are synchronized with the declination of the Sun. Such a calendar is called a tropical solar calendar.

The duration of the mean calendar year of such a calendar approximates some form of the tropical year, usually either the mean tropical year or the vernal equinox year.

The following are tropical solar calendars:

- Ancient Armenian calendar
- Bengali calendar (National and official calendar in Bangladesh)
- Gregorian calendar
- Iranian calendar (Jalāli calendar)
  - Tabarian calendar (Tabarian calendar)
- Indian national calendar (Saka calendar)
- French Republican calendar

Every one of these calendars has a year of 365 days, which is occasionally extended by adding an extra day to form a leap year, a method called "intercalation", the inserted day being "intercalary".

The Baháʼí calendar, another example of a solar calendar, always begins the year on the vernal equinox and sets its intercalary days so that the following year also begins on the vernal equinox. The moment of the vernal equinox in the northern hemisphere is determined using the location of Tehran "by means of astronomical computations from reliable sources".

=== Sidereal solar calendars ===
If the position of the Earth (see above) is reckoned with respect to the fixed stars, then the dates indicate the zodiacal constellation near which the Sun can be found. A calendar of this type is called a sidereal solar calendar.

The mean calendar year of such a calendar approximates the sidereal year.

Leaping from one lunation to another, but one Sidereal year is the period between two occurrences of the sun, as measured by the stars' solar calendar, which is derived from the Earth's orbit around the sun every 28 years.

Indian calendars like the Hindu calendar, Tamil calendar, Bengali calendar (revised) and Malayalam calendar are sidereal solar calendars. The Thai solar calendar when based on the Hindu solar calendar was also a sidereal calendar. They are calculated on the basis of the apparent motion of the Sun through the twelve zodiacal signs rather than the tropical movement of the Earth.

== Non-solar calendars ==
The Islamic calendar is a purely lunar calendar and has a year, whose start drifts through the seasons and so is not a solar calendar. The Maya Tzolkin calendar, which follows a 260-day cycle, has no year, therefore it is not a solar calendar. Also, any calendar synchronized only to the synodic period of Venus would not be solar.

== Lunisolar calendars ==
Lunisolar calendars may be regarded as solar calendars, although their dates additionally indicate the moon phase. Typical lunisolar calendars have years marked with a whole number of lunar months, so they can not indicate the position of Earth relative to the Sun with the same accuracy as a purely solar calendar.

== List of solar calendars ==
The following is a list of current, historical, and proposed solar calendars:

- Assamese calendar
- Assyrian calendar
- Badí‘ calendar
- Basotho calendar
- Bengali calendar
- Berber calendar
- Book of Jubilees calendar
- Bulgar calendar
- Byzantine calendar
- Caesar's Calendar
- Coptic calendar
- Discordian calendar
- EartHeaven calendar
- Enoch calendar
- Era Fascista
- Ethiopian calendar
- Florentine calendar
- French Republican Calendar
- Gregorian calendar
- Hanke-Henry Permanent Calendar
- Holocene calendar
- Indian national calendar
- International Fixed Calendar
- Invariable Calendar
- Jalali calendar
- Juche calendar
- Julian calendar
- Maithili calendar
- Malayalam calendar
- Minguo calendar
- Nanakshahi calendar
- Odia calendar
- Old Icelandic calendar
- Pancronometer
- Pataphysical calendar
- Pax Calendar
- Pentecontad calendar
- Pisan calendar
- Positivist calendar
- Revised Julian calendar
- Roman calendar
- Runic calendar
- Shaka Samvat
- Solar Hijri calendar
- Soviet calendar
- Swedish calendar
- Symmetry454
- Tamil calendar
- Thai solar calendar
- Tulu calendar
- World Calendar
- World Season Calendar
- Yoruba calendar
- Zoroastrian calendar

== See also ==
- Analemma calendar – Diagrammatic representation of Sun's position over a period of time
- Astronomical clock – Clock displaying astronomical information
- Daytime – Period of a day in which a location experiences natural illumination
- List of calendars
- Tropical year
