= Perpetual calendar =

Calendar designed to look up the day of the week for a given date

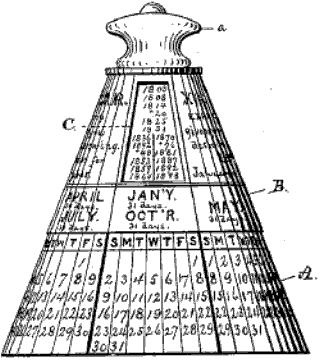
Illustration from 1881 U.S. Patent 248872, for a perpetual calendar paperweight. The upper section is rotated to reveal one of seven lists of years (splitting leap years) for which the seven calendars below apply.

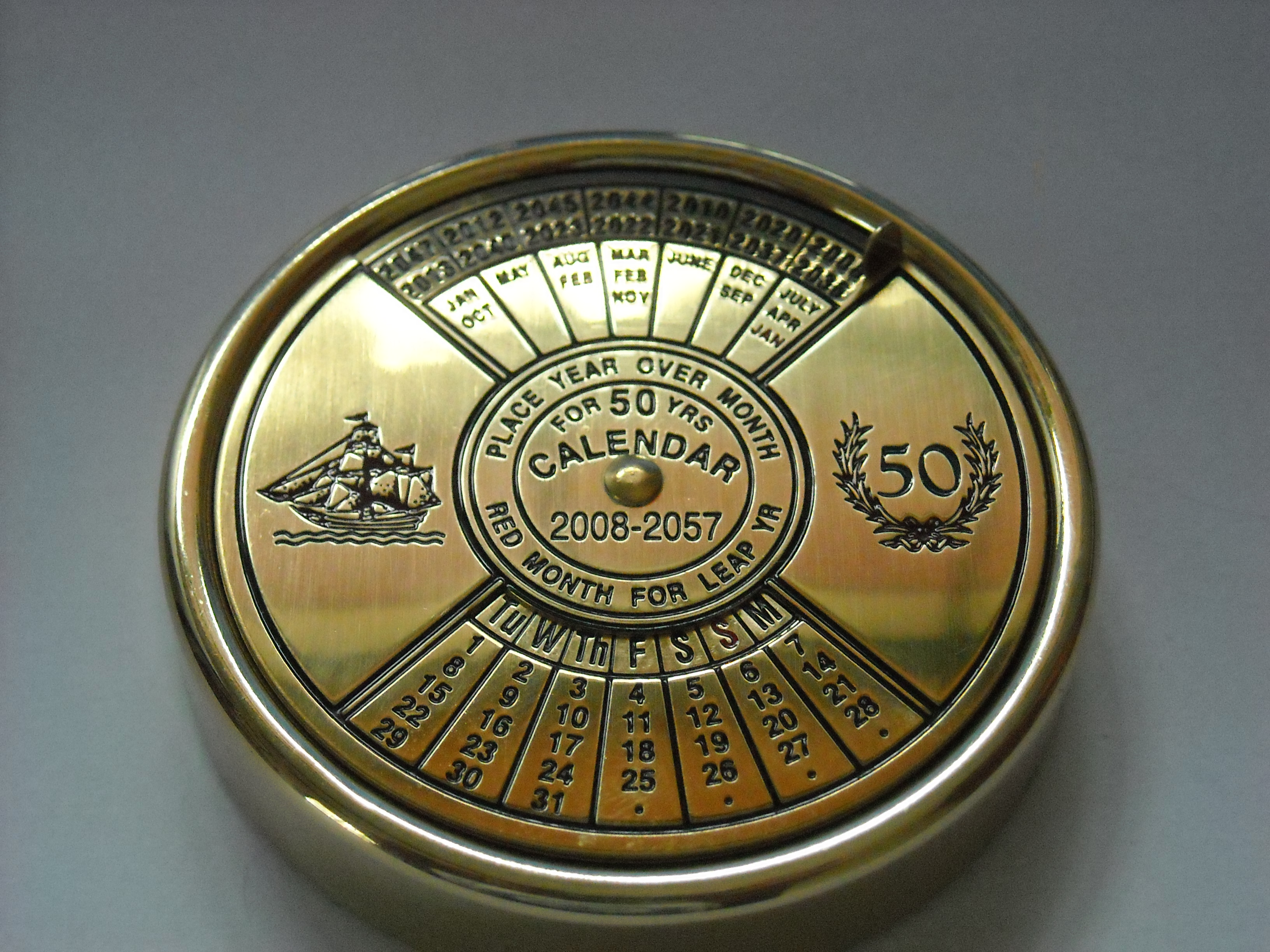
A 50-year "pocket calendar" that is adjusted by turning the dial to place the name of the month under the current year. One can then deduce the day of the week or the date.

A perpetual calendar is a calendar valid for many years, usually designed to look up the day of the week for a given date in the past or future.

For the Gregorian and Julian calendars, a perpetual calendar typically consists of one of three general variations:

1. Fourteen one-year calendars, plus a table to show which one-year calendar is to be used for any given year. These one-year calendars divide evenly into two sets of seven calendars: seven for each common year (the year that does not have a February 29) with each of the seven starting on a different day of the week, and seven for each leap year, again with each one starting on a different day of the week, totaling fourteen. (See Dominical letter for one common naming scheme for the 14 calendars.)
2. Seven (31-day) one-month calendars (or seven each of 28–31 day month lengths, for a total of 28) and one or more tables to show which calendar is used for any given month. Some perpetual calendars' tables slide against each other so that aligning two scales with one another reveals the specific month calendar via a pointer or window mechanism. The seven calendars may be combined into one, either with 13 columns of which only seven are revealed, or with movable day-of-week names (as shown in the pocket perpetual calendar picture).
3. A mixture of the above two variations - a one-year calendar in which the names of the months are fixed and the days of the week and dates are shown on movable pieces which can be swapped around as necessary.

Such a perpetual calendar fails to indicate the dates of moveable feasts such as Easter, which are calculated based on a combination of events in the tropical year and lunar cycles. These issues are dealt with in great detail in computus.

An early example of a perpetual calendar for practical use is found in the Nürnberger Handschrift GNM 3227a. The calendar covers the period of 1390–1495 (on which grounds the manuscript is dated to c. 1389). For each year of this period, it lists the number of weeks between Christmas and Quinquagesima. This is the first known instance of a tabular form of perpetual calendar allowing the calculation of the moveable feasts that became popular during the 15th century.

The chapel Cappella dei Mercanti, Turin contains a perpetual calendar machine made by Giovanni Plana using rotating drums.

== Other uses of the term "perpetual calendar" ==
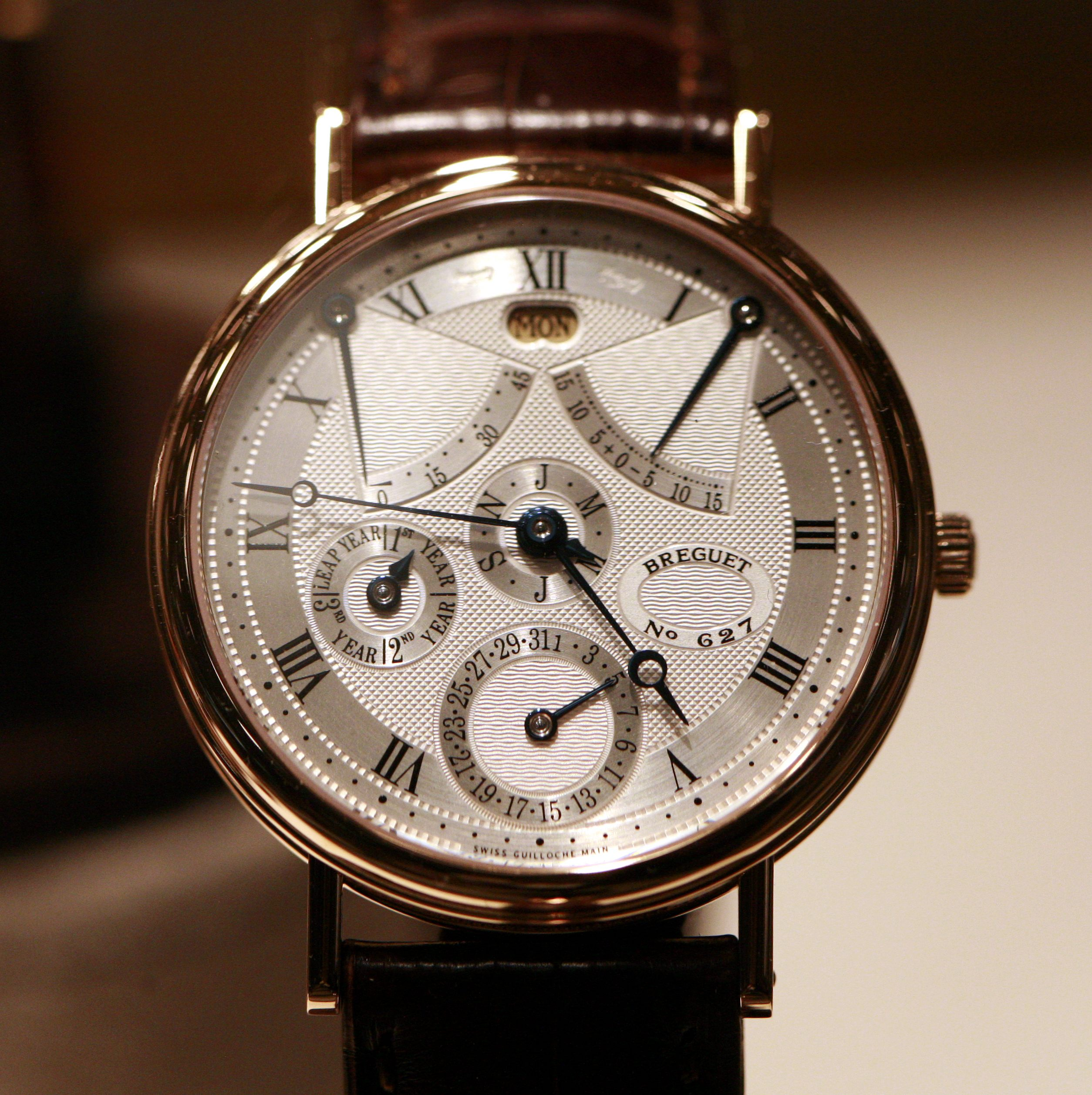
Breguet classique Grand complication perpetual calendar

Offices and retail establishments often display devices containing a set of elements to form all possible numbers from 1 through 31, as well as the names/abbreviations for the months and the days of the week, to show the current date for convenience of people who might be signing and dating documents such as checks. Establishments that serve alcoholic beverages may use a variant that shows the current month and day but subtracting the legal age of alcohol consumption in years, indicating the latest legal birth date for alcohol purchases. A common device consists of two cubes in a holder. One cube carries the digits zero to five. The other bears the digits 0, 1, 2, 6 (or 9 if inverted), 7, and 8. This is sufficient because only one and two may appear twice in date and they are on both cubes, while the 0 is on both cubes so that all single-digit dates can be shown in double-digit format. In addition to the two cubes, three blocks, each as wide as the two cubes combined, and a third as tall and as deep, have the names of the months printed on their long faces. The current month is turned forward on the front block, with the other two month blocks behind it.

Certain calendar reforms have been labeled perpetual calendars because their dates are fixed on the same weekdays every year. Examples are The World Calendar, the International Fixed Calendar and the Pax Calendar. Technically, these are not perpetual calendars but perennial calendars. Their purpose, in part, is to eliminate the need for perpetual calendar tables, algorithms, and computation devices.

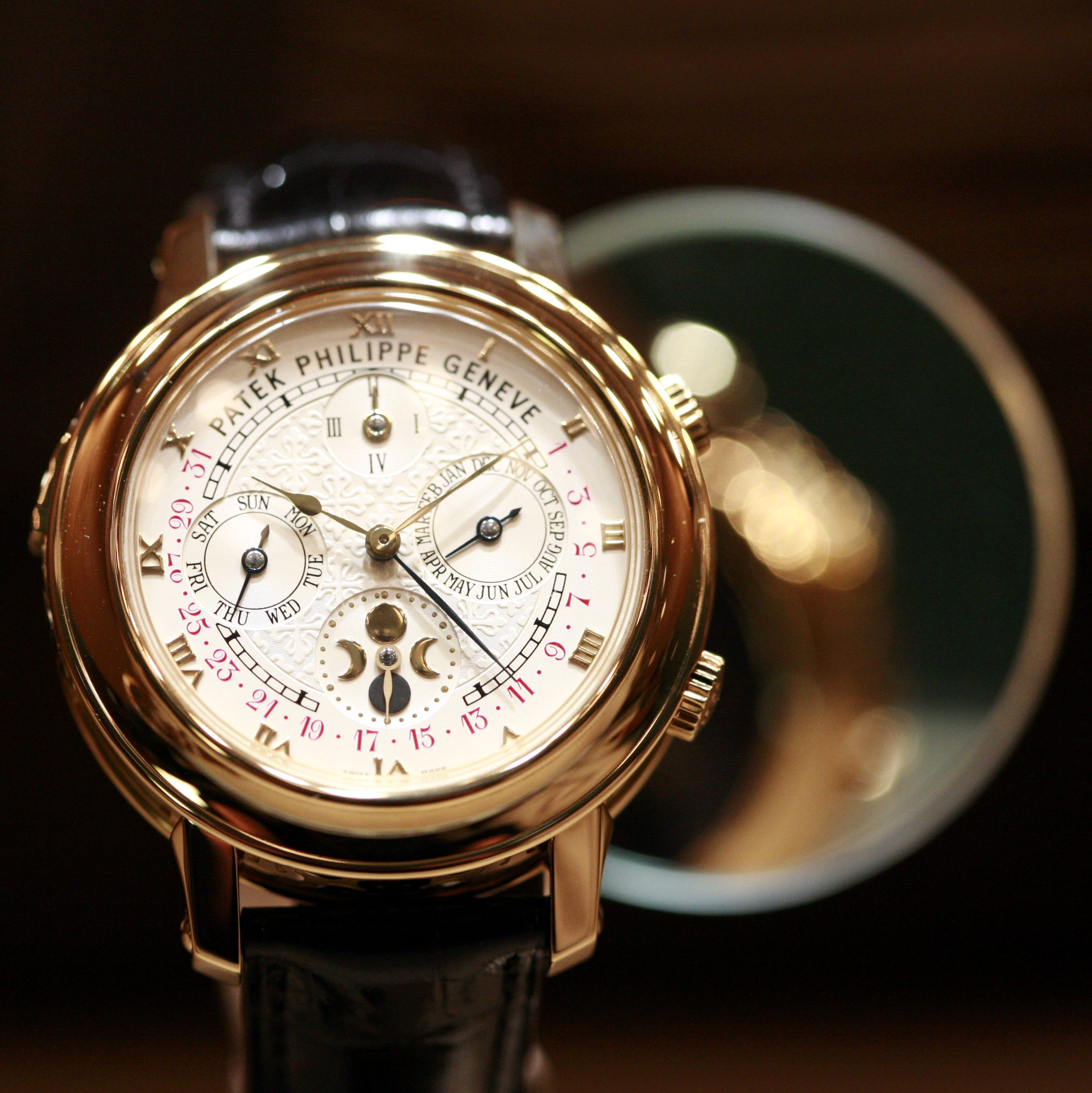
Perpetual calendar wristwatch by Patek Philippe

In watchmaking, "perpetual calendar" describes a calendar mechanism that correctly displays the date on the watch "perpetually", taking into account the different lengths of the months as well as leap years. The internal mechanism will move the dial to the next day.

== Algorithms ==
Perpetual calendars use algorithms to compute the day of the week for any given year, month, and day of the month. Even though the individual operations in the formulas can be very efficiently implemented in software, they are too complicated for most people to perform all of the arithmetic mentally. Perpetual calendar designers hide the complexity in tables to simplify their use.

A perpetual calendar employs a table for finding which of fourteen yearly calendars to use. A table for the Gregorian calendar expresses its 400-year grand cycle: 303 common years and 97 leap years total to 146,097 days, or exactly 20,871 weeks. This cycle breaks down into one 100-year period with 25 leap years, making 36,525 days, or one day less than 5,218 full weeks; and three 100-year periods with 24 leap years each, making 36,524 days, or two days less than 5,218 full weeks.

Within each 100-year block, the cyclic nature of the Gregorian calendar proceeds in the same fashion as its Julian predecessor: A common year begins and ends on the same day of the week, so the following year will begin on the next successive day of the week. A leap year has one more day, so the year following a leap year begins on the second day of the week after the leap year began. Every four years, the starting weekday advances five days, so over a 28-year period, it advances 35, returning to the same place in both the leap year progression and the starting weekday. This cycle completes three times in 84 years, leaving 16 years in the fourth, incomplete cycle of the century.

A major complicating factor in constructing a perpetual calendar algorithm is the peculiar and variable length of February, which was at one time the last month of the year, leaving the first 11 months March through January with a five-month repeating pattern: 31, 30, 31, 30, 31, ..., so that the offset from March of the starting day of the week for any month could be easily determined. Zeller's congruence, a well-known algorithm for finding the day of the week for any date, explicitly defines January and February as the "13th" and "14th" months of the previous year to take advantage of this regularity, but the month-dependent calculation is still very complicated for mental arithmetic:

$$\left\lfloor\frac{(m+1)13}{5}\right\rfloor \mod 7,$$

Instead, a table-based perpetual calendar provides a simple lookup mechanism to find offset for the day of the week for the first day of each month. To simplify the table, in a leap year January and February must either be treated as a separate year or have extra entries in the month table:

Month	Jan	Feb	Mar	Apr	May	Jun	Jul	Aug	Sep	Oct	Nov	Dec
Add	0	3	3	6	1	4	6	2	5	0	3	5
For leap years	6	2	3	6	1	4	6	2	5	0	3	5

== Perpetual Julian and Gregorian calendar tables ==
=== Table one (cyd) ===
The following calendar works for any date from 15 October 1582 onwards, but only for Gregorian calendar dates.

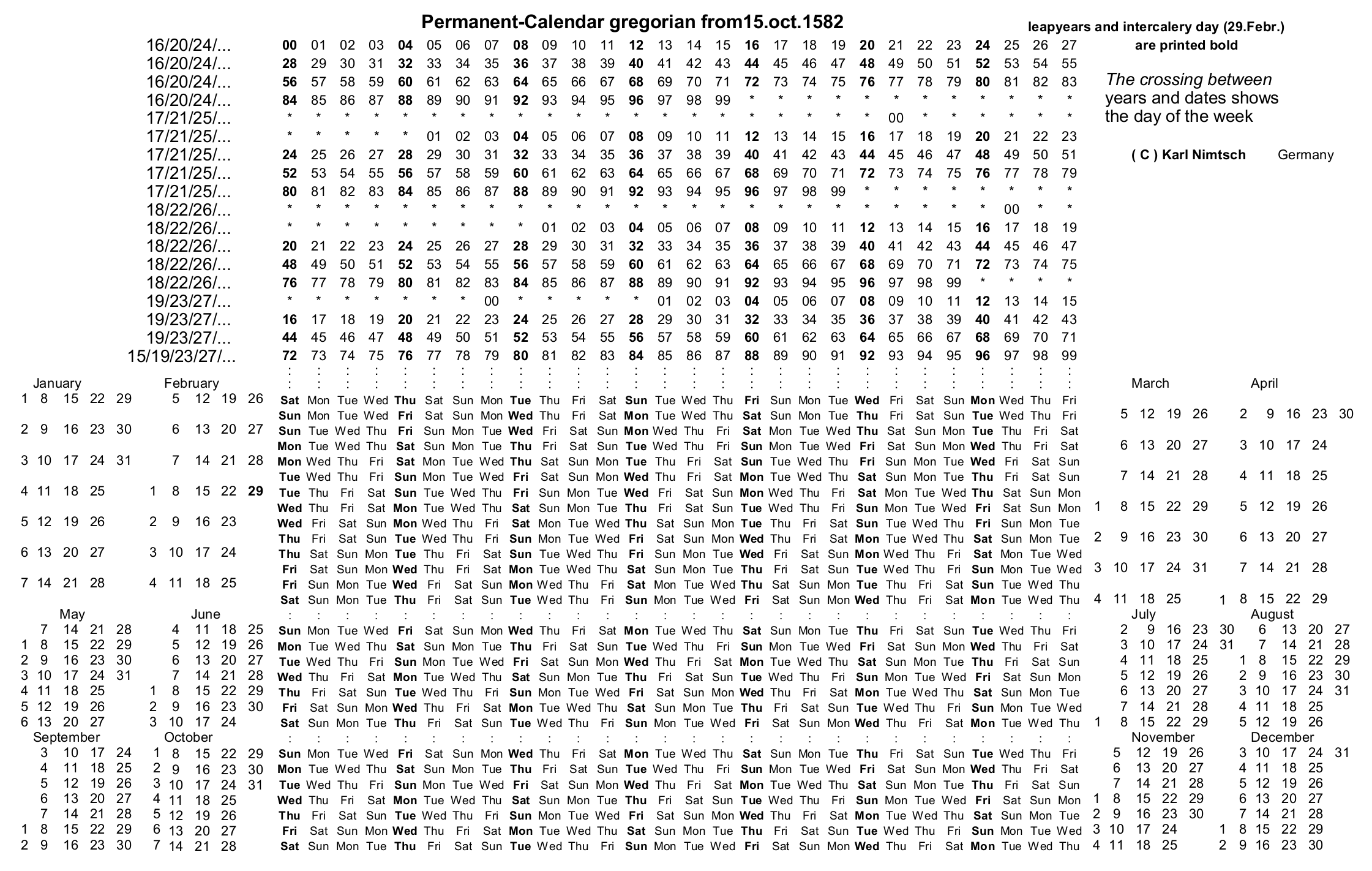
A genuinely perpetual calendar, which allows its user to look up the day of the week for any Gregorian date.

=== Table two (cymd) ===
						Years of the century							Example 1 Gregorian 31 March 2006: Greg century 20(c) and year 06(y) meet at A in the table of Latin square. The A in row Mar(m) meets 31(d) at Fri in the table of Weekdays. The day is Friday. Example 2 BC 1 January 45: BC 45 = -44 = -100 + 56 (a leap year). -1 and 56 meet at B and Jan_B meets 1 at Fri(day). Example 3 Julian 1 January 1900: Julian 19 meets 00 at A and Jan_A meets 1 at Sat(urday). Example 4 Gregorian 1 January 1900: Greg 19 meets 00 at G and Jan_G meets 1 at Mon(day).				
						00	01	02	03		04	05	Example 1 Gregorian 31 March 2006: Greg century 20(c) and year 06(y) meet at A in the table of Latin square. The A in row Mar(m) meets 31(d) at Fri in the table of Weekdays. The day is Friday. Example 2 BC 1 January 45: BC 45 = -44 = -100 + 56 (a leap year). -1 and 56 meet at B and Jan_B meets 1 at Fri(day). Example 3 Julian 1 January 1900: Julian 19 meets 00 at A and Jan_A meets 1 at Sat(urday). Example 4 Gregorian 1 January 1900: Greg 19 meets 00 at G and Jan_G meets 1 at Mon(day).				
						06	07		08	09	10	11	Example 1 Gregorian 31 March 2006: Greg century 20(c) and year 06(y) meet at A in the table of Latin square. The A in row Mar(m) meets 31(d) at Fri in the table of Weekdays. The day is Friday. Example 2 BC 1 January 45: BC 45 = -44 = -100 + 56 (a leap year). -1 and 56 meet at B and Jan_B meets 1 at Fri(day). Example 3 Julian 1 January 1900: Julian 19 meets 00 at A and Jan_A meets 1 at Sat(urday). Example 4 Gregorian 1 January 1900: Greg 19 meets 00 at G and Jan_G meets 1 at Mon(day).				
							12	13	14	15		16	Example 1 Gregorian 31 March 2006: Greg century 20(c) and year 06(y) meet at A in the table of Latin square. The A in row Mar(m) meets 31(d) at Fri in the table of Weekdays. The day is Friday. Example 2 BC 1 January 45: BC 45 = -44 = -100 + 56 (a leap year). -1 and 56 meet at B and Jan_B meets 1 at Fri(day). Example 3 Julian 1 January 1900: Julian 19 meets 00 at A and Jan_A meets 1 at Sat(urday). Example 4 Gregorian 1 January 1900: Greg 19 meets 00 at G and Jan_G meets 1 at Mon(day).				
						17	18	19		20	21	22	Example 1 Gregorian 31 March 2006: Greg century 20(c) and year 06(y) meet at A in the table of Latin square. The A in row Mar(m) meets 31(d) at Fri in the table of Weekdays. The day is Friday. Example 2 BC 1 January 45: BC 45 = -44 = -100 + 56 (a leap year). -1 and 56 meet at B and Jan_B meets 1 at Fri(day). Example 3 Julian 1 January 1900: Julian 19 meets 00 at A and Jan_A meets 1 at Sat(urday). Example 4 Gregorian 1 January 1900: Greg 19 meets 00 at G and Jan_G meets 1 at Mon(day).				
						23		24	25	26	27		Example 1 Gregorian 31 March 2006: Greg century 20(c) and year 06(y) meet at A in the table of Latin square. The A in row Mar(m) meets 31(d) at Fri in the table of Weekdays. The day is Friday. Example 2 BC 1 January 45: BC 45 = -44 = -100 + 56 (a leap year). -1 and 56 meet at B and Jan_B meets 1 at Fri(day). Example 3 Julian 1 January 1900: Julian 19 meets 00 at A and Jan_A meets 1 at Sat(urday). Example 4 Gregorian 1 January 1900: Greg 19 meets 00 at G and Jan_G meets 1 at Mon(day).				
						28	29	30	31		32	33	Example 1 Gregorian 31 March 2006: Greg century 20(c) and year 06(y) meet at A in the table of Latin square. The A in row Mar(m) meets 31(d) at Fri in the table of Weekdays. The day is Friday. Example 2 BC 1 January 45: BC 45 = -44 = -100 + 56 (a leap year). -1 and 56 meet at B and Jan_B meets 1 at Fri(day). Example 3 Julian 1 January 1900: Julian 19 meets 00 at A and Jan_A meets 1 at Sat(urday). Example 4 Gregorian 1 January 1900: Greg 19 meets 00 at G and Jan_G meets 1 at Mon(day).				
						34	35		36	37	38	39	Example 1 Gregorian 31 March 2006: Greg century 20(c) and year 06(y) meet at A in the table of Latin square. The A in row Mar(m) meets 31(d) at Fri in the table of Weekdays. The day is Friday. Example 2 BC 1 January 45: BC 45 = -44 = -100 + 56 (a leap year). -1 and 56 meet at B and Jan_B meets 1 at Fri(day). Example 3 Julian 1 January 1900: Julian 19 meets 00 at A and Jan_A meets 1 at Sat(urday). Example 4 Gregorian 1 January 1900: Greg 19 meets 00 at G and Jan_G meets 1 at Mon(day).				
							40	41	42	43		44	Example 1 Gregorian 31 March 2006: Greg century 20(c) and year 06(y) meet at A in the table of Latin square. The A in row Mar(m) meets 31(d) at Fri in the table of Weekdays. The day is Friday. Example 2 BC 1 January 45: BC 45 = -44 = -100 + 56 (a leap year). -1 and 56 meet at B and Jan_B meets 1 at Fri(day). Example 3 Julian 1 January 1900: Julian 19 meets 00 at A and Jan_A meets 1 at Sat(urday). Example 4 Gregorian 1 January 1900: Greg 19 meets 00 at G and Jan_G meets 1 at Mon(day).				
						45	46	47		48	49	50	Example 1 Gregorian 31 March 2006: Greg century 20(c) and year 06(y) meet at A in the table of Latin square. The A in row Mar(m) meets 31(d) at Fri in the table of Weekdays. The day is Friday. Example 2 BC 1 January 45: BC 45 = -44 = -100 + 56 (a leap year). -1 and 56 meet at B and Jan_B meets 1 at Fri(day). Example 3 Julian 1 January 1900: Julian 19 meets 00 at A and Jan_A meets 1 at Sat(urday). Example 4 Gregorian 1 January 1900: Greg 19 meets 00 at G and Jan_G meets 1 at Mon(day).				
						51		52	53	54	55		Example 1 Gregorian 31 March 2006: Greg century 20(c) and year 06(y) meet at A in the table of Latin square. The A in row Mar(m) meets 31(d) at Fri in the table of Weekdays. The day is Friday. Example 2 BC 1 January 45: BC 45 = -44 = -100 + 56 (a leap year). -1 and 56 meet at B and Jan_B meets 1 at Fri(day). Example 3 Julian 1 January 1900: Julian 19 meets 00 at A and Jan_A meets 1 at Sat(urday). Example 4 Gregorian 1 January 1900: Greg 19 meets 00 at G and Jan_G meets 1 at Mon(day).				
						56	57	58	59		60	61	Example 1 Gregorian 31 March 2006: Greg century 20(c) and year 06(y) meet at A in the table of Latin square. The A in row Mar(m) meets 31(d) at Fri in the table of Weekdays. The day is Friday. Example 2 BC 1 January 45: BC 45 = -44 = -100 + 56 (a leap year). -1 and 56 meet at B and Jan_B meets 1 at Fri(day). Example 3 Julian 1 January 1900: Julian 19 meets 00 at A and Jan_A meets 1 at Sat(urday). Example 4 Gregorian 1 January 1900: Greg 19 meets 00 at G and Jan_G meets 1 at Mon(day).				
						62	63		64	65	66	67	Example 1 Gregorian 31 March 2006: Greg century 20(c) and year 06(y) meet at A in the table of Latin square. The A in row Mar(m) meets 31(d) at Fri in the table of Weekdays. The day is Friday. Example 2 BC 1 January 45: BC 45 = -44 = -100 + 56 (a leap year). -1 and 56 meet at B and Jan_B meets 1 at Fri(day). Example 3 Julian 1 January 1900: Julian 19 meets 00 at A and Jan_A meets 1 at Sat(urday). Example 4 Gregorian 1 January 1900: Greg 19 meets 00 at G and Jan_G meets 1 at Mon(day).				
							68	69	70	71		72	Example 1 Gregorian 31 March 2006: Greg century 20(c) and year 06(y) meet at A in the table of Latin square. The A in row Mar(m) meets 31(d) at Fri in the table of Weekdays. The day is Friday. Example 2 BC 1 January 45: BC 45 = -44 = -100 + 56 (a leap year). -1 and 56 meet at B and Jan_B meets 1 at Fri(day). Example 3 Julian 1 January 1900: Julian 19 meets 00 at A and Jan_A meets 1 at Sat(urday). Example 4 Gregorian 1 January 1900: Greg 19 meets 00 at G and Jan_G meets 1 at Mon(day).				
						73	74	75		76	77	78	Example 1 Gregorian 31 March 2006: Greg century 20(c) and year 06(y) meet at A in the table of Latin square. The A in row Mar(m) meets 31(d) at Fri in the table of Weekdays. The day is Friday. Example 2 BC 1 January 45: BC 45 = -44 = -100 + 56 (a leap year). -1 and 56 meet at B and Jan_B meets 1 at Fri(day). Example 3 Julian 1 January 1900: Julian 19 meets 00 at A and Jan_A meets 1 at Sat(urday). Example 4 Gregorian 1 January 1900: Greg 19 meets 00 at G and Jan_G meets 1 at Mon(day).				
						79		80	81	82	83		Example 1 Gregorian 31 March 2006: Greg century 20(c) and year 06(y) meet at A in the table of Latin square. The A in row Mar(m) meets 31(d) at Fri in the table of Weekdays. The day is Friday. Example 2 BC 1 January 45: BC 45 = -44 = -100 + 56 (a leap year). -1 and 56 meet at B and Jan_B meets 1 at Fri(day). Example 3 Julian 1 January 1900: Julian 19 meets 00 at A and Jan_A meets 1 at Sat(urday). Example 4 Gregorian 1 January 1900: Greg 19 meets 00 at G and Jan_G meets 1 at Mon(day).				
						84	85	86	87		88	89	Example 1 Gregorian 31 March 2006: Greg century 20(c) and year 06(y) meet at A in the table of Latin square. The A in row Mar(m) meets 31(d) at Fri in the table of Weekdays. The day is Friday. Example 2 BC 1 January 45: BC 45 = -44 = -100 + 56 (a leap year). -1 and 56 meet at B and Jan_B meets 1 at Fri(day). Example 3 Julian 1 January 1900: Julian 19 meets 00 at A and Jan_A meets 1 at Sat(urday). Example 4 Gregorian 1 January 1900: Greg 19 meets 00 at G and Jan_G meets 1 at Mon(day).				
						90	91		92	93	94	95	Example 1 Gregorian 31 March 2006: Greg century 20(c) and year 06(y) meet at A in the table of Latin square. The A in row Mar(m) meets 31(d) at Fri in the table of Weekdays. The day is Friday. Example 2 BC 1 January 45: BC 45 = -44 = -100 + 56 (a leap year). -1 and 56 meet at B and Jan_B meets 1 at Fri(day). Example 3 Julian 1 January 1900: Julian 19 meets 00 at A and Jan_A meets 1 at Sat(urday). Example 4 Gregorian 1 January 1900: Greg 19 meets 00 at G and Jan_G meets 1 at Mon(day).				
							96	97	98	99			Example 1 Gregorian 31 March 2006: Greg century 20(c) and year 06(y) meet at A in the table of Latin square. The A in row Mar(m) meets 31(d) at Fri in the table of Weekdays. The day is Friday. Example 2 BC 1 January 45: BC 45 = -44 = -100 + 56 (a leap year). -1 and 56 meet at B and Jan_B meets 1 at Fri(day). Example 3 Julian 1 January 1900: Julian 19 meets 00 at A and Jan_A meets 1 at Sat(urday). Example 4 Gregorian 1 January 1900: Greg 19 meets 00 at G and Jan_G meets 1 at Mon(day).				
Centuries						Latin square							Months				
Julian				Greg.		Latin square							Months				
-4	3	10	17	—	—	F	E	D	C	B	A	G	Jan		Apr	Jul	
-3	4	11	18	15	19	G	F	E	D	C	B	A	Jan				Oct
-2	5	12	19	16	20	A	G	F	E	D	C	B			May		
-1	6	13	20	—	—	B	A	G	F	E	D	C	Feb			Aug	
0	7	14	21	17	21	C	B	A	G	F	E	D	Feb	Mar			Nov
1	8	15	22	—	—	D	C	B	A	G	F	E			Jun		
2	9	16	23	18	22	E	D	C	B	A	G	F				Sep	Dec
	Days					Weekdays											
	1	8	15	22	29	Mon	Tue	Wed	Thu	Fri	Sat	Sun					
	2	9	16	23	30	Tue	Wed	Thu	Fri	Sat	Sun	Mon					
	3	10	17	24	31	Wed	Thu	Fri	Sat	Sun	Mon	Tue					
	4	11	18	25		Thu	Fri	Sat	Sun	Mon	Tue	Wed					
	5	12	19	26		Fri	Sat	Sun	Mon	Tue	Wed	Thu					
	6	13	20	27		Sat	Sun	Mon	Tue	Wed	Thu	Fri					
	7	14	21	28		Sun	Mon	Tue	Wed	Thu	Fri	Sat					

Julian centuries	Gregorian centuries	Days of the week							Months					Days				
04 11 18	19 23 27	Sun	Mon	Tue	Wed	Thu	Fri	Sat	Jan	Apri	Jul			01	08	15	22	29
03 10 17		Mon	Tue	Wed	Thu	Fri	Sat	Sun				Sep	Dec	02	09	16	23	30
02 09 16	18 22 26	Tue	Wed	Thu	Fri	Sat	Sun	Mon			Jun			03	10	17	24	31
01 08 15		Wed	Thu	Fri	Sat	Sun	Mon	Tue	Feb	Mar			Nov	04	11	18	25	
00 07 14	17 21 25	Thu	Fri	Sat	Sun	Mon	Tue	Wed	Feb			Aug		05	12	19	26	
–1 06 13		Fri	Sat	Sun	Mon	Tue	Wed	Thu			May			06	13	20	27	
–2 05 12	16 20 24	Sat	Sun	Mon	Tue	Wed	Thu	Fri	Jan				Oct	07	14	21	28	
Years		00	01	02	03		04	05										
Years		06	07		08	09	10	11										
Years			12	13	14	15		16										
Years		17	18	19		20	21	22										
Years		23		24	25	26	27											
Years		28	29	30	31		32	33										
Years		34	35		36	37	38	39										
Years			40	41	42	43		44										
Years		45	46	47		48	49	50										
Years		51		52	53	54	55											
Years		56	57	58	59		60	61										
Years		62	63		64	65	66	67										
Years			68	69	70	71		72										
Years		73	74	75		76	77	78										
Years		79		80	81	82	83											
Years		84	85	86	87		88	89										
Years		90	91		92	93	94	95										
Years			96	97	98	99												

=== Table three (dmyc) ===
#	Julian centuries (mod 7)	Gregorian centuries (mod 4)	Dates			01; 08; 15; 22; 29	02; 09; 16; 23; 30	03; 10; 17; 24; 31	04; 11; 18; 25	05; 12; 19; 26	06; 13; 20; 27	07; 14; 21; 28	Years of the century (mod 28)																	
6	05 12 19	16 20 24	Apr	Jul	Jan	Sun	Mon	Tue	Wed	Thu	Fri	Sat	01	07	12	18		29	35	40	46		57	63	68	74		85	91	96
5	06 13 20		Sep	Dec		Sat	Sun	Mon	Tue	Wed	Thu	Fri	02		13	19	24	30		41	47	52	58		69	75	80	86		97
4	07 14 21	17 21 25	Jun			Fri	Sat	Sun	Mon	Tue	Wed	Thu	03	08	14		25	31	36	42		53	59	64	70		81	87	92	98
3	08 15 22		Feb	Mar	Nov	Thu	Fri	Sat	Sun	Mon	Tue	Wed		09	15	20	26		37	43	48	54		65	71	76	82		93	99
2	09 16 23	18 22 26	Aug	Feb		Wed	Thu	Fri	Sat	Sun	Mon	Tue	04	10		21	27	32	38		49	55	60	66		77	83	88	94	
1	10 17 24		May			Tue	Wed	Thu	Fri	Sat	Sun	Mon	05	11	16	22		33	39	44	50		61	67	72	78		89	95	
0	11 18 25	19 23 27	Jan	Oct		Mon	Tue	Wed	Thu	Fri	Sat	Sun	06		17	23	28	34		45	51	56	62		73	79	84	90		00

=== Perpetual calendar based on the dominical letter ===
A compact perpetual calendar (Julian and Gregorian) for the years 0 to 2399 based on the dominical letter of a year was devised by the American astronomer G.M. Clemence. It was first published in 1954 in the 9th edition of the Smithsonian Physical Tables and was also adopted from 1956 until the mid 1960s in The World Almanac and Book of Facts.

== See also ==
- Determination of the day of the week – Methods to calculate the day of the week
- Doomsday rule – Way of calculating the day of the week of a given date
- Long Now Foundation – American nonprofit organization
- Time formatting and storage bugs – Class of software bugs
