= Hanke–Henry Permanent Calendar =

Proposal for calendar reform

The Hanke–Henry Permanent Calendar (HHPC) is a proposal for calendar reform. It is one of many examples of leap week calendars, calendars that maintain synchronization with the solar year by intercalating entire weeks rather than single days. It is a modification of a previous proposal, Common-Civil-Calendar-and-Time (CCC&T). With the Hanke–Henry Permanent Calendar, every calendar date always falls on the same day of the week. A major feature of the calendar system is the abolition of time zones.

== Features ==
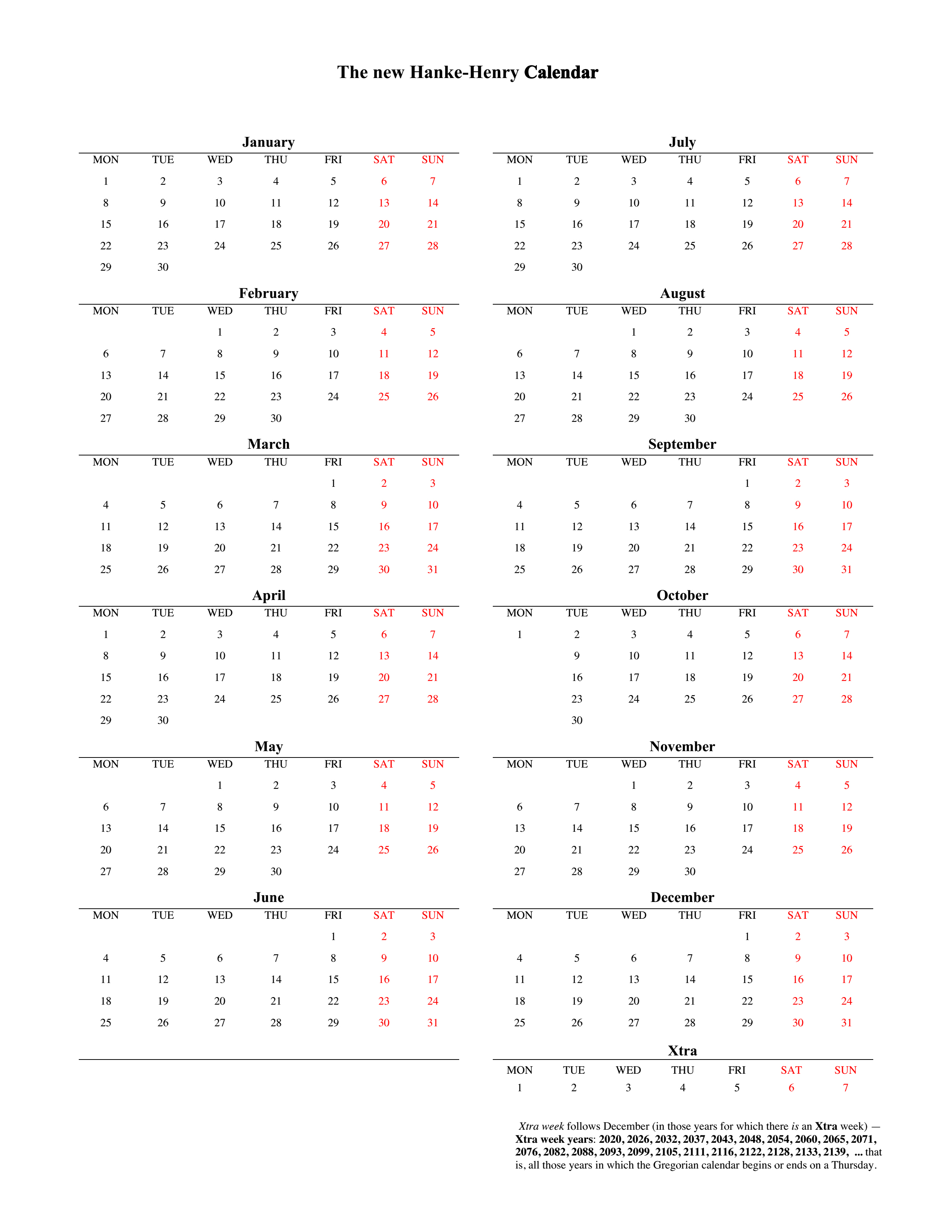
The latest Hanke-Henry calendar

While many calendar reforms aim to make the calendar more accurate, the Hanke–Henry Permanent Calendar focuses on making the calendar perennial, so that every date falls on the same day of the week, year after year. The familiar drift of weekdays concerning dates results from the fact that the number of days in a physical year (one full orbit of Earth around the Sun, approximately 365.24 days) is not a multiple of seven. By reducing common years to 364 days (52 weeks), and adding an extra week every five or six years, the Hanke–Henry Permanent Calendar eliminates weekday drift and synchronizes the calendar year with the seasonal change as the Earth circles the Sun. The leap week known as "Xtra", occurs every year that either begins (dominical letters D, DC) or ends (D, ED) in a Thursday on the corresponding Gregorian calendar, and falls between the end of December and the beginning of January. Thus, each year always begins between December 29 and January 4 in the Gregorian calendar. This is effectively the same rule as in ISO week dates.

Under the Hanke–Henry Permanent Calendar January, February, April, May, July, August, October, and November have thirty days, while March, June, September, and December have thirty-one so that each quarter contains two 30-day months followed by one month of 31 days (30:30:31). While the Hanke–Henry Permanent Calendar changes the length of the months, the week and days remain the same.

Hanke and Henry do not offer a serious discussion of anniversaries, especially the ones commemorated on January 31st, May 31st, July 31st, August 31st, and October 31st (as these days are eliminated). Their website FAQ simply recommends to either celebrate one's birthday on a random day of one's choosing, or more systematically use the 30th and last day of that month, which makes sense for some feasts like Halloween at least, which should be on the day before All Hallows on the 1st day of November. A third solution, which has been adopted with calendar reforms elsewhere, would be to apply the calendar proleptically and find the corresponding date in the original year, though this would probably have to be done for all dates: e.g. July 4th, 1776 (Independence Day) was a Thursday as it is in HHPC, but July 14th, 1789 (Bastille Day) was on a Tuesday, not a Sunday, and would hence need to be moved to the July 16th.

As part of the calendar proposal, time zones would be eliminated and replaced with Coordinated Universal Time (UTC).

Henry argues that his proposal will succeed where some others have failed because it keeps the weekly cycle intact, and therefore respects the Fourth Commandment (Remember the sabbath day, to keep it holy) of Judaism and Christianity.

Quarter
1st month
2nd month
3rd month
1st

January
Mo	Tu	We	Th	Fr	Sa	Su
01	02	03	04	05	06	07
08	09	10	11	12	13	14
15	16	17	18	19	20	21
22	23	24	25	26	27	28
29	30

February
Mo	Tu	We	Th	Fr	Sa	Su
		01	02	03	04	05
06	07	08	09	10	11	12
13	14	15	16	17	18	19
20	21	22	23	24	25	26
27	28	29	30

March
Mo	Tu	We	Th	Fr	Sa	Su
				01	02	03
04	05	06	07	08	09	10
11	12	13	14	15	16	17
18	19	20	21	22	23	24
25	26	27	28	29	30	31

2nd

April
Mo	Tu	We	Th	Fr	Sa	Su
01	02	03	04	05	06	07
08	09	10	11	12	13	14
15	16	17	18	19	20	21
22	23	24	25	26	27	28
29	30

May
Mo	Tu	We	Th	Fr	Sa	Su
		01	02	03	04	05
06	07	08	09	10	11	12
13	14	15	16	17	18	19
20	21	22	23	24	25	26
27	28	29	30

June
Mo	Tu	We	Th	Fr	Sa	Su
				01	02	03
04	05	06	07	08	09	10
11	12	13	14	15	16	17
18	19	20	21	22	23	24
25	26	27	28	29	30	31

3rd

July
Mo	Tu	We	Th	Fr	Sa	Su
01	02	03	04	05	06	07
08	09	10	11	12	13	14
15	16	17	18	19	20	21
22	23	24	25	26	27	28
29	30

August
Mo	Tu	We	Th	Fr	Sa	Su
		01	02	03	04	05
06	07	08	09	10	11	12
13	14	15	16	17	18	19
20	21	22	23	24	25	26
27	28	29	30

September
Mo	Tu	We	Th	Fr	Sa	Su
				01	02	03
04	05	06	07	08	09	10
11	12	13	14	15	16	17
18	19	20	21	22	23	24
25	26	27	28	29	30	31

4th

October
Mo	Tu	We	Th	Fr	Sa	Su
01	02	03	04	05	06	07
08	09	10	11	12	13	14
15	16	17	18	19	20	21
22	23	24	25	26	27	28
29	30

November
Mo	Tu	We	Th	Fr	Sa	Su
		01	02	03	04	05
06	07	08	09	10	11	12
13	14	15	16	17	18	19
20	21	22	23	24	25	26
27	28	29	30

December
Mo	Tu	We	Th	Fr	Sa	Su
				01	02	03
04	05	06	07	08	09	10
11	12	13	14	15	16	17
18	19	20	21	22	23	24
25	26	27	28	29	30	31

Xtra
Mo	Tu	We	Th	Fr	Sa	Su
01	02	03	04	05	06	07

== History ==
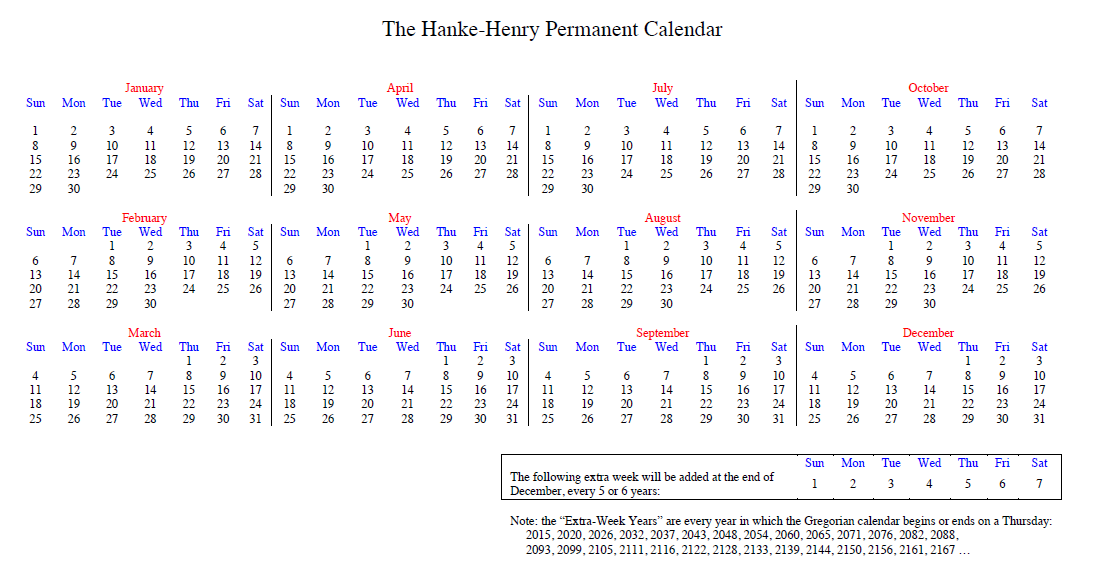
Hanke–Henry Permanent Calendar pre-2016 version with weeks still starting Sunday, but Xtra already at the end of the year

In 2004, Richard Conn Henry, a professor of astronomy at Johns Hopkins University, proposed the adoption of a calendar known as Common-Civil-Calendar-and-Time (CCC&T), which he described as a modification to a proposal by Robert McClenon. Henry's original version had essentially the same structure given above, but inserted its leap week named "Newton" between June and July in the middle of the year.

The leap rule was chosen to match the ISO week leap rule, to minimize the variation in the start of the year relative to the Gregorian calendar, whereas Robert McClenon originally proposed a simple leap rule which would result in larger astronomic variance: Years whose numbers are divisible by 5 had a leap week, but years whose numbers are divisible by 40 did not unless they are also divisible by 400.

Henry had advocated transition to the calendar on January 1, 2006, as that is a year in which his calendar and the Gregorian calendar begin the year on the same day. After that date passed, he recommended dropping off December 31, 2006, to start in 2007, or dropping December 30 and 31, 2007, to start 2008.

In late 2011 the calendar was revised by Johns Hopkins economist Steve Hanke by moving the leap week from the middle to the end of the year and renaming it "Extra", producing the Hanke–Henry Permanent Calendar. The target date for universal adoption was January 1, 2017, then, but was postponed to 2018, when the calendar design was changed in early 2016 to adopt Monday as the start of the week, quarter and year, to better comply with existing international standard ISO 8601.

In 2016, web developer Black Tent Digital released the official Hanke-Henry calendar app, with capabilities to convert between Gregorian and Hanke-Henry Calendars, in order to facilitate transition to the Hanke-Henry system. It is no longer available as of March, 2018.

In May 2019, Steve Hanke published an editorial via the Cato Institute, suggesting that U.S. President Donald Trump should adopt the Hanke-Henry Permanent Calendar by executive order, including in this editorial a sample executive order for Trump to use. Hanke suggested that the occasional leap week known as "Xtra" should be called "Trump Week" and the calendar itself re-named the "Trump Calendar."

== Comparison ==
The key difference between Robert McClenon's calendar proposal and Henry's modification is that the former has a simple rule for determining which years have a leap week. This rule resembles the Gregorian leap year rule and has the same cycle length. Years whose numbers are divisible by 5 have a leap week, but years whose numbers are divisible by 40 do not have a leap week unless also divisible by 400. The main drawback of this rule is that the new year varies 17 days relative to the Gregorian new year (e.g. year 1965 begins 11 days earlier than Gregorian 1965 and year 2036 begins 6 days later than Gregorian 2036), whereas Henry's adoption of the ISO week date rule ensures that the new year always begins within three days of the Gregorian new year.

The key difference between Irv Bromberg's calendar proposal Symmetry010 and Hanke/Henry’s is the pattern of month lengths, the former putting the longer month in the middle of each quarter (30:31:30). The more ambitious Symmetry454 furthermore has every month consist of exactly 4 or 5 weeks (28:35:28). Both proposals start the week on Monday and are intended to be used with a different leap rule, resulting in a 293-year leap cycle.

Other proposals, like the Pax Calendar from 1930 and the International Fixed Calendar popularized by Cotsworth and Eastman, feature a perennial calendar with 13 months of 28 days each. The former also has a leap week whereas the latter has one day at the end of each year belonging to no month or week and another in leap years.

== Advantages ==
- The calendar itself is permanent, it does not change year to year, with the exception of the need to add a week at the end of every 5 or 6 years.
- Quarters all have the same number of days, simplifying financial calculations.
  For example, this calendar would have prevented Apple’s Q4 2012 reporting anomaly, where due to the odd number of weeks in a year and to ensure a consistent reporting period, Apple reported quarterly results after the usual thirteen weeks instead of the fourteen the year before due to there being a leap week in the quarter, causing many investors who did not notice the adjustment to believe Apple had been less profitable than forecast.
- With the 30:30:31 layout and not counting national holidays, the first two months of each quarter have 22 work days each and every third month in common years has 21 work days, if Saturday and Sunday are considered the weekend off from work. The alternative 30:31:30 and 31:30:30 layouts would have greater variance: 23:22:20 and 22:23:20, respectively.
- Unlike some other reform proposals, it does not change the days of the week or the names of the months.
- The calendar starts on the same day every year, Monday, 1 January. (It was Sunday in earlier versions.)
- As in the Gregorian calendar, Sunday to Sunday is always seven days, as is Saturday to Saturday, or Friday to Friday. (Note: "Sunday to Sunday" here means the start of one Sunday to the start of the next Sunday). Because no days are ever added outside a seven-day week, there should be no objection from religious groups concerned about weekly holy days. (In proposals that add single days outside the week, like the World Calendar, a true "seventh day" of rest or worship would drift between weekends and weekdays.)
- No day is more than 5 days before or after its Gregorian namesake and nearly all days are within 4 days.
- Since the revised version is compatible with ISO week date, a lot of software is already prepared to support the HHPC. Programmers just need to add a way to group weeks into quarters and split these into months.

== Disadvantages ==
- Annual fixed-date events (e.g. birthdays, anniversaries) always occur on the same day of the week every year, though many of those with weekend birthdays could see this as an advantage.
- Birthdays and anniversaries occurring on the 53rd (leap) week would occur only once every five to six years, and such birthdays and anniversaries would be over five times as common as February 29 birthdays and anniversaries are in the Gregorian calendar.
- The calendar is not as precisely aligned with the solar year as the existing Gregorian calendar and some proposed reform calendars, therefore may require continued use of more accurate astronomic calendars for certain agricultural purposes.
- If it became the default calendar, all computer date-handling would have to be fixed, which will be much more complicated than the Y2K fix, although the new compatibility with ISO 8601 week dates would help.
- The changed month lengths do not approximate lunar phases any better.
- Months of 30 or 31 days each do not take full advantage of the perennial nature of leap week calendars, like months of 4 or 5 weeks each would do.
- The leap weeks would complicate time periods counted in months. On the current calendar maximum difference in lengths of such periods is three days. On the Hanke-Henry permanent calendar it would be seven days and the exception would be longer than the norm.
- The last month in each quarter has one day more than the other two (30:30:31), but if, as in ISO 8601, a week belongs to the month the majority of its days are in, then the second month has one week more than the other two (4:5:4).
- Leap years are more difficult to determine than in some other proposals, with the simplest algorithm being dependent on the Gregorian calendar's weekday cycle.
- Doing away with time zones would make for unfamiliar and anomalous situations: for example, noon, i.e. the natural mid-day when the sun is overhead, is vastly set apart from 12:00, the chronographical mid-day, for most places in the world. It would make travel harder as one would have to learn completely new schedules for each longitude.
- The (current) name is not neutral.
- The day-of-month dates of certain holidays, like Halloween/Samhain on 31 October, and events are lost, therefore would need to be celebrated on a different date, e.g. 30 October, but this affects fewer dates than in reform proposals with 13 months of 4 weeks each.
