= Elisabeth Achelis =

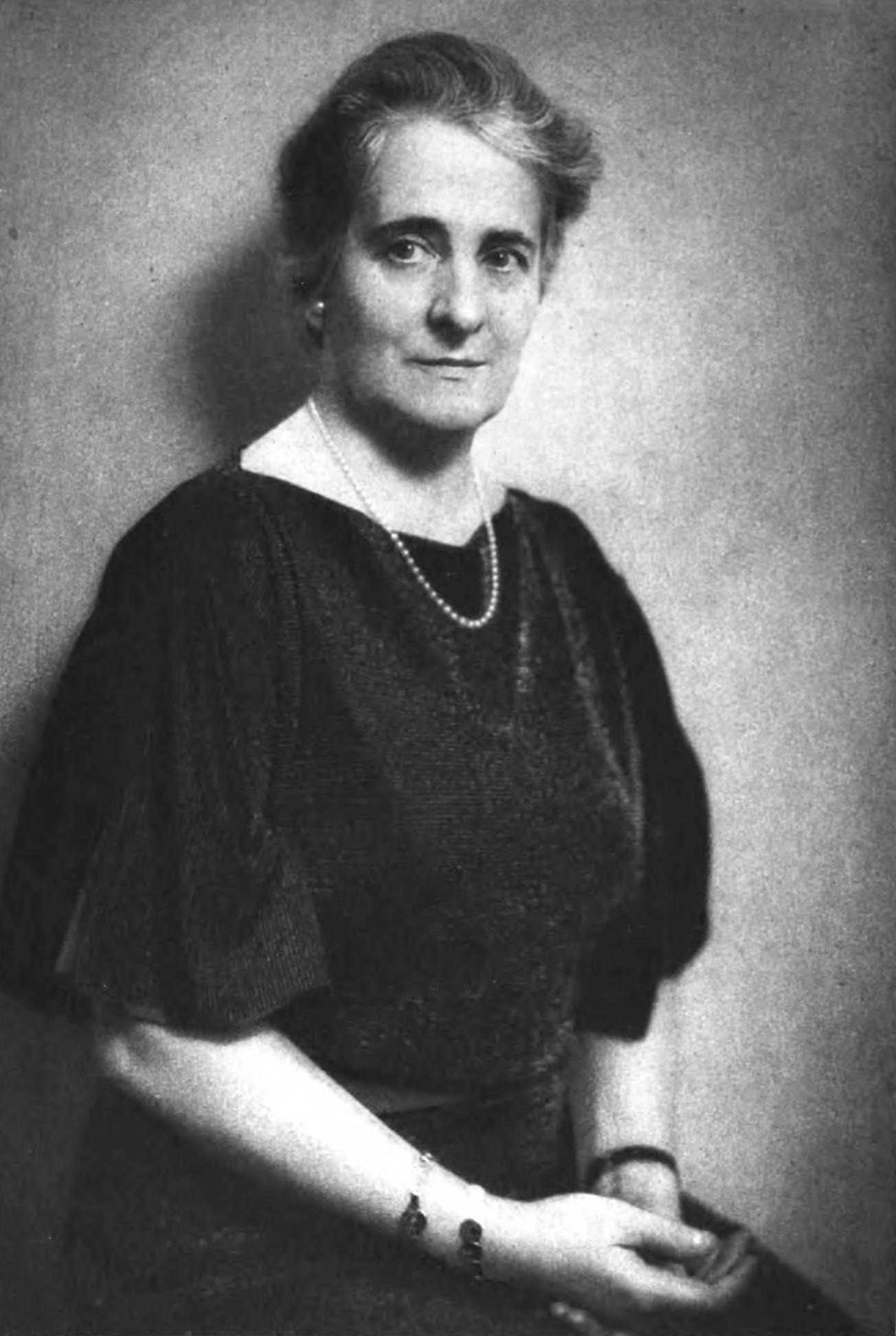
- Born: January 11, 1880; Brooklyn, New York, US
- Died: February 11, 1973 (aged 93); Brooklyn, New York, US
- Years active: 1930–56
- Known for: Founding The World Calendar Association
- Notable work: Journal of Calendar Reform

Elisabeth Achelis (January 11, 1880 – February 11, 1973) was founder of the World Calendar Association in 1930 and served as its president.

== Biography ==
Elisabeth Achelis was born in 1880 in Brooklyn, New York, the daughter of Frederick and Bertha Franziska Achelis. She had a twin sister named Margaret, and attended Brooklyn Heights Seminary and the Ogontz School in Pennsylvania. She was an heir to the American Hard Rubber Company fortune.

In 1929 she attended a lecture by Melvil Dewey at the Lake Placid Club on the idea of a thirteen month calendar, proposed by Moses B. Cotsworth. She was taken by the idea of calendar reform but was appalled by the strict rigidity of the 28-day month, 13-month system.

Achelis founded The World Calendar Association (TWCA) in 1930, in direct opposition to Cotsworth's International Fixed Calendar League, with the goal of worldwide adoption of the World Calendar. It functioned for most of the next twenty-five years as The World Calendar Association, Inc. Throughout the 1930s, support for the concept grew in the League of Nations, the precursor of the United Nations. Achelis started the Journal of Calendar Reform in 1931, publishing it for twenty-five years, and wrote five books.

Also, Achelis wrote in 1955, "While Affiliates and Committees have over the years and still are able to approach all branches of their governments, the Incorporated (International) Association was prevented from seeking legislation in the United States lest it lose its tax exempt status. Because of this I have been prevented from doing in my own country that which I have been urging all other Affiliates to do in theirs."

She died in her sleep at age 93 on February 11, 1973, in New York.

== Works ==
- The World Calendar – Addresses and Occasional Papers Chronologically Arranged on the Progress of Calendar Reform Since 1930. New York: G.P. Putnam's Sons. 1937. OCLC 1169241 – via Internet Archive.
- The Calendar for Everybody. New York: G.P. Putnam's Sons. 1943. OCLC 1416471. Archived from the original on January 19, 2021 – via HathiTrust.
- The Calendar for the Modern Age. New York: Thomas Nelson & Sons. 1951. OCLC 1048617 – via Internet Archive.
- Of Time and the Calendar. New York: Hermitage House Inc. 1955. OCLC 795816.
- Be Not Silent. New York: Pageant Press, Inc. 1961. OCLC 1009359252 – via Google Books. (Autobiography)

== See also ==
- Joseph Herman Hertz
