= Invariable Calendar =

In April 1900, Professor L. A. Grosclaude of Geneva proposed the Invariable Calendar, New Era Calendar, or Normal Calendar with 12 months and four 91-day quarters of exactly 13 weeks. The final month of each quarter would have 31 days, the others 30 days each. Quarters all began on a Monday. An additional day, termed New Year's Day, that was not any day of the week and not part of any month, would occur between December 31 and January 1. Another such day is inserted between June 31 and July 1 on leap years. This placement of the leap day is virtually the only difference to Armelin's calendar which has it at the end of the year.

This model would be a perennial calendar, with each date occurring perennially on the same day of the week. Grosclaude lists many business advantages to this. Three monthly days important to businesses, the 1st, 15th, and 30th would always occur on the same 3 days of the week, respectively, and additionally would never occur on a Sunday, for example. It became the model for The World Calendar, promoted by Elisabeth Acheils and The World Calendar Association since 1930.

== Structure ==
Year layout by months and days
Month	01	02	03	04	05	06	07	08	09	10	11	12	13	14	15	16	17	18	19	20	21	22	23	24	25	26	27	28	29	30	31
New Years Day
January	Mo	Tu	We	Th	Fr	Sa	Su	Mo	Tu	We	Th	Fr	Sa	Su	Mo	Tu	We	Th	Fr	Sa	Su	Mo	Tu	We	Th	Fr	Sa	Su	Mo	Tu	—N/a
February	We	Th	Fr	Sa	Su	Mo	Tu	We	Th	Fr	Sa	Su	Mo	Tu	We	Th	Fr	Sa	Su	Mo	Tu	We	Th	Fr	Sa	Su	Mo	Tu	We	Th	—N/a
March	Fr	Sa	Su	Mo	Tu	We	Th	Fr	Sa	Su	Mo	Tu	We	Th	Fr	Sa	Su	Mo	Tu	We	Th	Fr	Sa	Su	Mo	Tu	We	Th	Fr	Sa	Su
April	Mo	Tu	We	Th	Fr	Sa	Su	Mo	Tu	We	Th	Fr	Sa	Su	Mo	Tu	We	Th	Fr	Sa	Su	Mo	Tu	We	Th	Fr	Sa	Su	Mo	Tu	—N/a
May	We	Th	Fr	Sa	Su	Mo	Tu	We	Th	Fr	Sa	Su	Mo	Tu	We	Th	Fr	Sa	Su	Mo	Tu	We	Th	Fr	Sa	Su	Mo	Tu	We	Th	—N/a
June	Fr	Sa	Su	Mo	Tu	We	Th	Fr	Sa	Su	Mo	Tu	We	Th	Fr	Sa	Su	Mo	Tu	We	Th	Fr	Sa	Su	Mo	Tu	We	Th	Fr	Sa	Su
Leap Day
July	Mo	Tu	We	Th	Fr	Sa	Su	Mo	Tu	We	Th	Fr	Sa	Su	Mo	Tu	We	Th	Fr	Sa	Su	Mo	Tu	We	Th	Fr	Sa	Su	Mo	Tu	—N/a
August	We	Th	Fr	Sa	Su	Mo	Tu	We	Th	Fr	Sa	Su	Mo	Tu	We	Th	Fr	Sa	Su	Mo	Tu	We	Th	Fr	Sa	Su	Mo	Tu	We	Th	—N/a
September	Fr	Sa	Su	Mo	Tu	We	Th	Fr	Sa	Su	Mo	Tu	We	Th	Fr	Sa	Su	Mo	Tu	We	Th	Fr	Sa	Su	Mo	Tu	We	Th	Fr	Sa	Su
October	Mo	Tu	We	Th	Fr	Sa	Su	Mo	Tu	We	Th	Fr	Sa	Su	Mo	Tu	We	Th	Fr	Sa	Su	Mo	Tu	We	Th	Fr	Sa	Su	Mo	Tu	—N/a
November	We	Th	Fr	Sa	Su	Mo	Tu	We	Th	Fr	Sa	Su	Mo	Tu	We	Th	Fr	Sa	Su	Mo	Tu	We	Th	Fr	Sa	Su	Mo	Tu	We	Th	—N/a
December	Fr	Sa	Su	Mo	Tu	We	Th	Fr	Sa	Su	Mo	Tu	We	Th	Fr	Sa	Su	Mo	Tu	We	Th	Fr	Sa	Su	Mo	Tu	We	Th	Fr	Sa	Su
Month	01	02	03	04	05	06	07	08	09	10	11	12	13	14	15	16	17	18	19	20	21	22	23	24	25	26	27	28	29	30	31

Quarter layout by weeks
Q1 month	Q2 month	Q3 month	Q4 month	Mon	Tue	Wed	Thu	Fri	Sat	Sun
January	April	July	October	01	02	03	04	05	06	07
January	April	July	October	08	09	10	11	12	13	14
January	April	July	October	15	16	17	18	19	20	21
January	April	July	October	22	23	24	25	26	27	28
January	April	July	October	29	30	—N/a				
February	May	August	November	—N/a		01	02	03	04	05
February	May	August	November	06	07	08	09	10	11	12
February	May	August	November	13	14	15	16	17	18	19
February	May	August	November	20	21	22	23	24	25	26
February	May	August	November	27	28	29	30	—N/a		
March	June	September	December	—N/a				01	02	03
March	June	September	December	04	05	06	07	08	09	10
March	June	September	December	11	12	13	14	15	16	17
March	June	September	December	18	19	20	21	22	23	24
March	June	September	December	25	26	27	28	29	30	31

== Criticism ==
- The Sabbatarian objection, that the strict cycle of the seven-day week is interrupted; sometimes there are seven days between sabbaths, instead of the usual six.
- Difficulties of defining the dates of New Year's and Leap Days when they don't belong to any month or week.

== Other calendars and proposals ==
- List of calendars: Reform calendars
- Calendar reform: Specific proposals
- Armelin's calendar

== Sources ==
- A Proposed Plan For An Invariable Calendar, Sunday Magazine, David Friedman, June 25, 2010, at 9:02 am, PDF
- A PROPOSED PLAN FOR AN INVARIABLE CALENDAR, June 26, 1910, The New York Times, Hedley P. Somner, PDF
- The Reform of the Calendar, Popular Astronomy, vol. 20, pp. 232–236, 04/1912, Ralph E. Wilson, PDF
  - The Reform of the Calendar, Publications of the Astronomical Society of the Pacific, Vol. 24, No. 141, p. 113, PDF
- Wanted—A Brand-New Calendar, Popular Science, Jan 1927, pp. 33–34, 134–135, Frank Parker Stockbridge
- THE REFORM OF THE CALENDAR, ALEXANDER PHILIP, 1914, Diagram, PDF
