= Leap week calendar =

Calendar system with a whole number of weeks in a year

A leap week calendar is a calendar system with a whole number of weeks in a year, and with every year starting on the same weekday. Most leap week calendars are proposed reforms to the civil calendar, in order to achieve a perennial calendar. Some, however, such as the ISO week date calendar, are simply conveniences for specific purposes.

The ISO calendar in question is a variation of the Gregorian calendar that is used (mainly) in government and business for fiscal years, as well as in timekeeping. In this system a year (ISO year) has 52 or 53 full weeks (364 or 371 days).

Leap week calendars vary on whether the concept of month is preserved and whether the month (if preserved) has a whole number of weeks. The Pax Calendar and Hanke–Henry Permanent Calendar preserve or modify the Gregorian month structure. The ISO week date system is an example of a leap week calendar that eliminates the month.

A leap week calendar can take advantage of the 400-year cycle of the Gregorian calendar, as it has exactly 20,871 weeks: with 329 common years of 52 weeks plus 71 leap years of 53 weeks, a leap week calendar would synchronize with the Gregorian every 400 years since (329 × 52 + 71 × 53 = 20,871).

== Advantages ==
- The calendar starts on the same day of the week every year; there are no fragments of weeks at the beginning or end of the year.
- Unlike the Gregorian Calendar, variations of years are limited to the possible addition of a leap week.
- Unlike certain proposed calendar reforms such as the World Calendar and International Fixed Calendar, there are no exceptions to the regular cycle of the week. This avoids opposition from religious groups who object to the interruption of the weekday sequence.

== Disadvantages ==
- Although the calendar starts on the same day of the week every year, not all countries observe the same day as the start of their week. This will therefore present an issue if a leap week calendar is intended for use in multiple countries.
- A year with an intercalary/leap week is 7 days longer than a year without an intercalary week. Consequently, the equinoxes and solstices must vary over 7 days, i.e. ±3 of the average date, or even more, such as 19 days in the Pax Calendar.
- While persons born during the added intercalary week lose their real birthday in common years, similarly to those born on 29 February in the Gregorian calendar, approximately 1 in 294 days would belong to an intercalary week, compared to the approximately 1 in 1506 days that occur on 29 February.
- Leap year rules are more complicated than the Gregorian, since leap years are not at fixed intervals, meaning there is no simple approximation (i.e. one in four years): see Pax Calendar and Hanke–Henry Permanent Calendar § Disadvantages and Symmetry454 § Leap rule. The best comparable rule to Gregorian "every fourth year, except when divisible by 100, unless also divisible by 400" probably is "every fifth year, except when divisible by 40, unless also divisible by 400", at the expense of even more severe astronomic jitter than rules with equal spread.
- Quarterly accounting statistics will not be consistent over multiple years due to the yearly quarter containing the intercalary week having 14 weeks instead of the usual 13. This issue could arguably be minimised by placing the intercalary week at the end of the year.
