= Calendar reform =

Significant revision of a calendar system

Calendar reform or calendrical reform is any significant revision of a calendar system. The term sometimes is used instead for a proposal to switch to a different calendar design.

== Principles ==
The prime objective of a calendar is to unambiguously identify any day in past, present and future by a specific date in order to record or organize social, religious, commercial or administrative events. Recurring periods that contain multiple days, such as weeks, months, and years, are secondary, convenient features of a calendar. Most cultures adopt a primary dating system, but different cultures have always needed to align multiple calendars with each other, either because they coexisted in the same space (e.g. secular and religious groups with different demands) or had established trading relations.

Once specified, a calendar design cannot be altered without becoming a new design. If a proposed design is sufficiently close to the legacy one, i.e. compatible with it, a reform of the local calendar system is possible without disruption. Examples of this include the changes to the Chinese calendar due to problems between regions in China and practical changes in religious calendars such as the Islamic calendar, where the start of the month is now derived from astronomical data rather than sightings by religious leaders.

Some design changes, however, will yield date identifiers different from the previous design for some days, often in the distant past or future.

The calendar system must clarify whether dates are changed to the new design retroactively (using a proleptic calendar) or whether the design in use then and there shall be respected. Calendar schisms happen if not all cultures that adopted a common calendar system before perform a calendar reform at the same time. If date identifiers are similar but different, confusion and mistakes are unavoidable.

Most calendars have several rules which could be altered by reform:

- Whether and how days are grouped into subdivisions such as months and weeks, and days outside those subdivisions, if any.
- Which years are leap years and common years and how they differ.
- Numbering of years, selection of the epoch, and the issue of year zero.
- Start of the year (such as the December solstice, January 1, March 1, March equinox, Lady Day).
- If a week is retained, the start, length, and names of its days.
- Start of the day (midnight, sunrise, noon, or sunset).
- If months are retained, number, lengths, and names of months.
- Special days and periods (such as leap day or intercalary day).
- Alignment with social cycles.
- Alignment with astronomical cycles.
- Alignment with biological cycles.
- Literal notation of dates.

== Historical reforms ==
Historically, most calendar reforms have been made in order to synchronize the calendar with the astronomical year (either solar or sidereal) and/or the synodic month in lunar or lunisolar calendars. Most reforms for calendars have been to make them more accurate. This has happened to various lunar and lunisolar calendars, and also the Julian calendar, when it was altered to the Gregorian calendar.

The fundamental problems of the calendar are that the astronomical year has neither a whole number of days nor a whole number of lunar months; neither does the lunar month have a whole number of days: in each case there are fractions "left over". (In some physical circumstances the rotations and revolutions of a planet and its satellite(s) can be phase-locked – for example the same side of the moon always faces the Earth – but this has not operated to lock together the lengths of the Earth's year, day and month.) Such remainders could accumulate from one period to the next, thereby driving the cycles out of synchronization.

A typical solution to force synchronization is intercalation. This means occasionally adding an extra day, week, or month into the cycle. An alternative approach is to ignore the mismatch and simply let the cycles continue to drift apart. The general approaches include:

- The lunar calendar, which fits days into the cycle of lunar months, adding an extra day when needed, while ignoring the annual solar cycle of the seasons.
- The solar calendar, which fits artificial months into the year, adding an extra day into one month when needed, while ignoring the lunar cycle of new/full moons.
- The lunisolar calendar, which keeps both the lunar and solar cycles, adding an extra month into the year when needed.

An obvious disadvantage of the lunisolar method of inserting a whole extra month is the large irregularity of the length of the year from one to the next. The simplicity of a lunar calendar has always been outweighed by its inability to track the seasons, and a solar calendar is used in conjunction to remedy this defect. Identifying the lunar cycle month requires straightforward observation of the Moon on a clear night. However, identifying seasonal cycles requires much more methodical observation of stars or a device to track solar day-to-day progression, such as that established at places like Stonehenge. After centuries of empirical observations, the theoretical aspects of calendar construction could become more refined, enabling predictions that identified the need for reform.

=== Reform of lunar and lunisolar calendars ===
There have been 50 to 100 reforms of the traditional Chinese calendar over 2500 years, most of which were intended to better fit the calendar months to astronomical lunations and to more accurately add the extra month so that the regular months maintain their proper seasonal positions, even though each seasonal marker can occur anywhere within its month. There have been at least four similar reforms of the lunisolar version of the Hindu calendar, all intended to make the month a better match to the lunation and to make the year a better fit to the sidereal year. There have been reforms of the solar version of the Hindu calendar which changed the distribution of the days in each month to better match the length of time that the Sun spends in each sidereal zodiacal sign. The same applies to the Buddhist calendar. The first millennium reform of the Hebrew calendar changed it from an observational calendar into a calculated calendar. The Islamic calendar was a reform of the preceding lunisolar calendar which completely divorced it from the solar year.

Another reform was performed in Seljuk Persia by Omar Khayyam and others, developing the precisely computed Jalali calendar.

=== Julian and Gregorian reforms ===
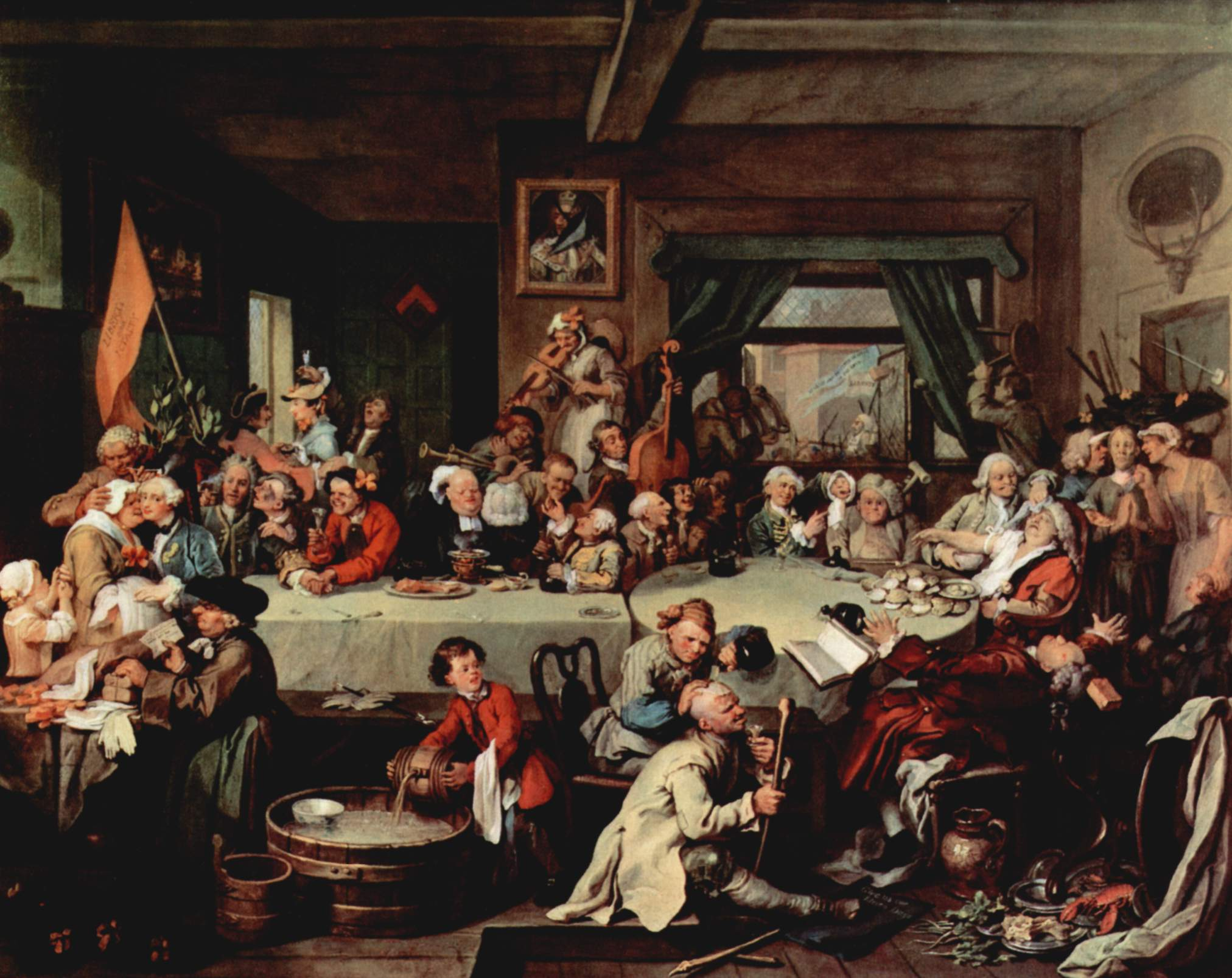
William Hogarth's An Election Entertainment includes a banner with the protest slogan against the Gregorian calendar: "Give us our Eleven days" (on floor at lower right)

When Julius Caesar took power in Rome, the Roman calendar had ceased to reflect the year accurately.

The Julian reform made 46 BC 445 days long and replaced the intercalary month with an intercalary day to be inserted within February every four years. This produced a noticeably more accurate calendar, but it had an average year length of 365 days and six hours (365.25 days), which had the effect of adding about three-quarters of an hour every four years. The effect accumulated from inception in 45 BC until by the 16th century the northward equinox was falling on March 10 or 11.

Under Pope Gregory XIII, the leap year rule was altered: only centennial years evenly divisible by 400 are leap years. Thus, the years 1600, 2000, 2400, and 2800 are leap years, while 1700, 1800, 1900, 2100, 2200, 2300, 2500, 2600, 2700, 2900, and 3000 are common years despite being divisible by 4. This rule makes the mean year 365.2425 days (365 d, 5 h, 49 min, 12 s) long. While this does not synchronize the years entirely, it would require a few thousand years to accumulate a day.

So that the northward equinox would have the same date in the new Gregorian calendar as it had when the Council of Nicaea made recommendations in AD 325 (March 21), ten days were dropped so that October 5 became October 15 in 1582.

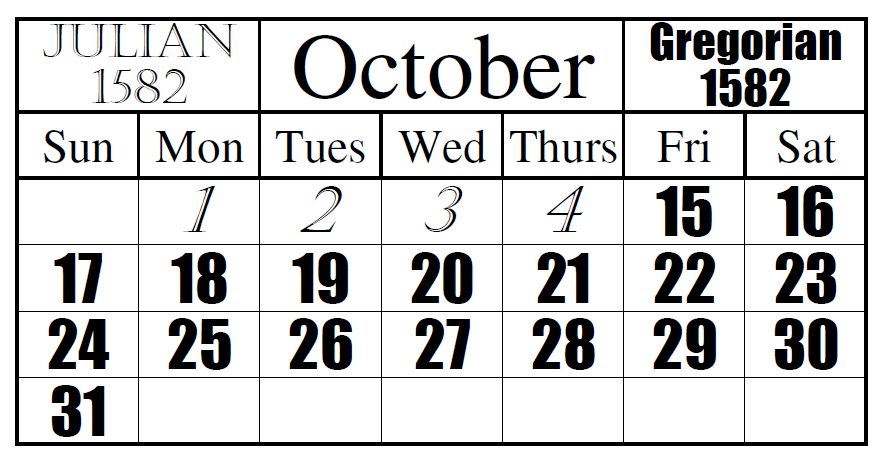
Julian to Gregorian Date Change

This reform took a few centuries to spread through the nations that used the Julian calendar, although the Russian church year still uses the Julian calendar. Those nations that adopted this calendar on or after 1700, had to drop more than ten days: Great Britain, for instance, dropped eleven.

In 1923, Milutin Milanković proposed to a synod of some Eastern Orthodox Churches at Constantinople that only centennial years that leave a remainder of 200 or 600 upon division by 900 would be leap years, decreasing the average year length to 365.242̅ days: these remainders were chosen to delay as much as possible the first year (after the year of 1923) that this calendar would disagree with the Gregorian calendar, which occurs in 2800. It was adopted by some Eastern Orthodox Churches, under the names Revised Julian calendar or New calendar, but was rejected by others.

== Proposals ==
The Gregorian calendar is currently used by most of the world. There is also an international standard describing the calendar, ISO 8601, with some differences from traditional conceptions in many cultures.

Since the papal reform in 1582, several proposals have been offered to make the Gregorian calendar more useful or regular. Very few reforms have gained official acceptance. The rather different decimal French Republican Calendar was one such official reform, but was abolished twelve years later by Napoleon. After World War II, the newly formed United Nations continued efforts of its predecessor, the League of Nations, to establish the proposed World Calendar but postponed the issue after a veto from the government of the United States, which was mainly based upon concerns of religious groups about the proposed days that would be outside the seven-day week cycle ("blank days") and thus disrupt having a sabbath every seven days. Independently the World Council of Churches still tries to find a common rule for the date of Easter, which might be eased by a new common calendar.

Reformers cite several problems with the Gregorian calendar:

- It is not perennial. Each year starts on a different day of the week and calendars expire every year.
- It is difficult to determine the weekday of any given day of the year or month.
- Months are not equal in length, nor regularly distributed across the year, and so some people rely on mnemonics (e.g., "Thirty days hath September" or knuckle counting) to remember the lengths of months.
- The year's four quarters (of three full months each) are not equal (being of 90/91, 91, 92 and 92 days respectively). Business quarters that are equal would make accounting easier.
- Its epoch, i.e. start of the year count, is religious. The same applies to month and weekday names in many languages.
- Each month has no connection with the lunar phases.
- Solstices and equinoxes do not coincide with either the beginning of the Gregorian months or the midpoint of the months.
- The calendar does not have a year zero: the year after 1 BC was 1 AD, with nothing in between them.

It is hard or even impossible to solve all these issues in just one calendar.

Most plans evolve around the solar year of a little more than 365 days. This number does not divide well by seven or twelve, which are the traditional numbers of days per week and months per year respectively. The nearby numbers 360, 364 and 366 are divisible in better ways. There are also lunar-centric proposals.

=== Perennial calendars ===
Many calendar reforms have offered solutions to make the Gregorian calendar perennial. These reforms would make it easy to work out the day of the week of a particular date, and would make changing calendars each year unnecessary. There are, roughly speaking, two options to achieve this goal: leap week calendars and intercalation of a day to the weeks. Leap week calendars add a leap week of seven days to the calendar every five or six years to keep the calendar roughly in step with the tropical year. They have years of either 364 days (52 weeks) or 371 days (53 weeks), thus preserving the 7-day week.

Proposals mainly differ in their selection of a leap rule, placing of the leap item (usually middle or end of the year), in the start day of the week and year, in the number (12 or 13) and size of months and in connected naming; some are compatible to the week date of ISO 8601.

The World Calendar, favored by the UN in the 1950s, and the International Fixed Calendar, quite popular among economists between the World Wars, are proposals that start each year on a Sunday. The 364 days within the week system form 52 weeks of 7 days. The World Calendar has every quarter beginning on the same day of the week. In the World Calendar, the 365th and 366th day are considered holidays and named Worlds Day and Leap Year Day. These "off-calendar" days stand outside the seven-day week and caused some religious groups to strongly oppose adoption of the World Calendar. Such concerns helped prevent the World Calendar from being adopted. Supporters of the World Calendar, however, argue that the religious groups' opposition overlooked every individual's right to celebrate these holidays as extra days of worship, or Sabbaths. This option, they reason, maintained the seven-day worship cycle for those who share that concern, while allowing benefits of a perennial calendar to be shared by all.

Some calendar reform ideas, such as the Pax Calendar, Symmetry454 calendar and the Hanke–Henry Permanent Calendar, were created to solve this problem by having years of either 364 days (52 weeks) or 371 days (53 weeks), thus preserving the 7-day week. The 53-week calendar, used in government and in business for fiscal years, is a variant of this concept. Each year of this calendar can be up to 371 days long.

Some calendars have quarters of regularly patterned uneven months e.g., a 35-day (five-week) month and a pair of 28-day (four-week) months, with a leap week appended to the final month when needed. The Common Civil Calendar and Time calendar has months of 30 and 31 days, but inserts a leap week in the middle of the year, when needed, whereas its successor, the Hanke–Henry Permanent Calendar, moves the extra week to the end of the year.

In the World Season Calendar, months are discarded altogether; instead, the year is divided into four seasons of 13 weeks each. An extra day (two days during leap year) is added to the calendar that is not assigned a day of the week in order to perennialize the calendar. The same calendar of 91 days is used for each season of every year.

=== 10-month calendars ===
A decimal calendar is a calendar which includes units of time based on the decimal system.

The French Republican Calendar was introduced (along with decimal time) in 1793. It consisted of twelve months, each divided into three décades of ten days, with five or six intercalary days called sansculottides. The calendar was abolished by Napoleon on January 1, 1806.

=== 12-month calendars ===
The lengths of the months inherited from the old Roman calendar as reformed by Julius Caesar do not follow any apparent logic systematically. Many reform proposals seek to make the pattern more uniform. When keeping the traditional dozen months and the close approximation of a solar year, this usually yields four equal quarters of three months each where one month is longer than the other two. World Calendar and Hanke–Henry Permanent Calendar follow this with 31:30:30 and 30:30:31 days per month, respectively. On the other hand, Symmetry454 uses 4:5:4 weeks per month. They all result in 364 systematically distributed days and hence have to add either one extra and one leap day or a leap week.

=== 13-month calendars ===
Some calendar reformers seek to equalize the length of each month in the year. This is often accomplished by creating a calendar that has 13 months of 4 weeks (28 days) each, making 364 days. The earliest known proposal of this type was the Georgian Calendar (1745) by Rev. Hugh Jones.

The Positivist calendar (1849), created by Auguste Comte, was based on a 364-day year which included one or two "blank" days. Each of the 13 months had 28 days and exactly four weeks, and each started on a Monday. The International Fixed Calendar is a more modern descendant of this calendar: invented by Moses B. Cotsworth and financially backed by George Eastman.

Around 1930, one James Colligan invented the Pax Calendar, which avoids off-calendar days by adding a 7-day leap week to the 364-day common year for 71 out of 400 years.

=== Lunisolar calendars ===
Lunisolar calendars usually have 12 or 13 months of 29 or 30 days.

The Hermetic Lunar Week Calendar is a lunisolar calendar proposal which has 12 or 13 lunar months of 29 or 30 days a year, and begins each year near the vernal equinox.

The Meyer–Palmen Solilunar Calendar has 12 lunar months with 29 or 30 days plus a leap month called Meton every 3 or 2 years with 30 or 31 days. 60 years together are called a cycle. It uses a leap cycle which has equal number of days, weeks, months, years and cycles. 2498258 days, 356894 weeks, 84599 months, 6840 years and 114 cycles nearly all equal each other. It is called an era, although time isn't divided into it in this calendar.

Some propose to improve leap rules of existing calendars, such as the Hebrew calendar. The Rectified Hebrew calendar uses a more accurate leap cycle of 4366 months per 353-year cycle, with 130 leap years per cycle, and a progressively shorter molad interval, intended to replace the 19-year leap cycle and the constant molad interval of the traditional fixed arithmetic Hebrew calendar, respectively.

=== Naming ===
Calendar proposals that introduce a thirteenth month or change the Julian-Gregorian system of months often also propose new names for these months. New names have also been proposed for days out of the week cycle (e.g., 365th and leap) and weeks out of the month cycle.

Proposals to change the traditional month and weekday names are less frequent. The Gregorian calendar obtains its names mostly from gods of historical religions (e.g., Thursday from Nordic Thor or March from Roman Mars) or leaders of vanished empires (July and August from the first Caesars), or ordinals that got out of synchronization (September through December, originally seventh through tenth, now ninth through twelfth). This was mangled when January was made the start of the year instead of March.

==== Examples ====
Comte's Positivist calendar, for example, proposed naming the 13 months in his calendar after figures from religion, literature, philosophy and science. Similarly, the Hermetic Lunar Week Calendar uses 12 or 13 lunar months named after 13 contributors to research on psychoactive plants and chemicals.

=== Specific proposals ===
There have been many specific calendar proposals to replace the Gregorian calendar:

The following count one or more days outside the standard seven-day week:

- International Fixed Calendar
- Invariable Calendar
- Positivist calendar
- World Calendar
- World Season Calendar

The following are leap week calendars:

- Hanke–Henry Permanent Calendar
- Pax Calendar
- Symmetry454

There have also been proposals to revise the way years are numbered:

- Anno Lucis
- Holocene calendar

Reform of the Islamic calendar:

- Since the beginning of the 21st century, there is a trend within the Muslim communities of North America and Europe to substitute a lunar calendar based on calculations for the traditional Islamic method of monthly observation of the new moon to declare the beginning of the new month in each country separately.

== See also ==
- Abolition of time zones
- Determination of the day of the week
- Decimal calendar
- Hanke–Henry Permanent Calendar
- List of calendars
- Metric time
- Old Calendarists

Precursors of the Gregorian reform

- Johannes de Sacrobosco, De Anni Ratione ("On reckoning the years"), c. 1235
- Roger Bacon, Opus Majus ("Greater Work"), c. 1267
