= Perennial calendar =

Type of calendar applicable to any year

A perennial calendar is a calendar that applies to any year, keeping the same dates, weekdays and other features.

Perennial calendar systems differ from most widely used calendars which are annual calendars. Annual calendars include features particular to the year represented, and expire at the year's end. A perennial calendar differs also from a perpetual calendar, which is a tool or reference to compute the weekdays of dates for any given year, or for representing a wide range of annual calendars.

For example, most representations of the Gregorian calendar year include weekdays and are therefore annual calendars, because the weekdays of its dates vary from year to year. For this reason, proposals to perennialize the Gregorian calendar typically introduce one or another scheme for fixing its dates on the same weekdays every year.

== History and background ==
The term perennial calendar appeared as early as 1824, in the title of Thomas Ignatius Maria Forster's Perennial calendar and companion to the almanack. In that work he compiled "the events of every day in the year, as connected with history, chronology, botany, natural history, astronomy, popular customs and antiquities, with useful rules of health, observations on the weather, explanations of the feasts and festivals of the church and other miscellaneous useful information". The data listed there for each date in the calendar apply in every year, and supplement data to be found in annual almanacs. Often printed in perennial-calendar format also are book blanks for diaries, ledgers and logs, for use in any year. Entries on the blank pages of these books are organized by calendar dates, without reference to weekdays or year numbers.

== Calendar reform ==
A goal of modern calendar reform has been to achieve universal acceptance of a perennial calendar, with dates fixed always on the same weekdays, so the same calendar table serves year after year. Advantages claimed for a perennial over an annualized calendar like the Gregorian are simplicity and regularity. Scheduling is simplified for institutions and industries with extended production cycles. School terms and breaks, for example, can fall annually on the same dates. Month-based ordinal dating ("Fourth Thursday in November", "Last Monday in May") will be obsolete. Two methods favored for perennializing the calendar are the introduction of so-called "blank days" and of a periodic "leap week".

=== Blank-day calendars ===
Blank-day calendars remove a day or two (the latter for leap years) from the weekday cycle, resulting in a year length of 364 weekdays. Since this number is evenly divisible by 7, every year can begin on the same weekday. In the twelve-month plan of The World Calendar, for example, the Gregorian year-end date of December 31 is sequestered from the cycle of the week and celebrated as "Worldsday". December 30 falls on a Saturday, Worldsday follows next, and then January 1 begins every new year on a Sunday. The extra day in leap year is treated similarly. Blank-day calendars with thirteen months have also been developed. Among them are: The Georgian calendar, by Hirossa Ap-Iccim (=Rev. Hugh Jones) (1745); The Positivist calendar, by Auguste Comte (1849); and the International Fixed Calendar, by Moses B. Cotsworth (1902), and championed by George Eastman. Blank-day reform proposals face a religious objection, however. Sabbatarians, who are obliged to regard every seventh day as a day of rest and worship, must observe their holy day on a different weekday each year.

=== Leap-week calendars ===
Leap week calendar plans often restrict common years to 364 days, or 52 weeks, and expand leap years to 371 days, or 53 weeks. The added week may extend an existing month, or it may stand alone as an inserted seven-day month.

The leap-week calendar may have been conceived originally by Rev. George M. Searle (1839-1918), around 1905. In 1930, James A. Colligan, S.J. proposed a thirteen-month reform, the Pax Calendar. By 1955, Cecil L. Woods proposed the twelve-month Jubilee Calendar which inserts an extra week called "Jubilee" before January in specified years. The Hanke–Henry Permanent Calendar (2003) inserts an extra year-end month of seven days called "Xtra", and the Symmetry454 calendar (circa 2004) lengthens the month of December by one week on leap years.

==== Easter in leap-week calendars ====
The Christian celebration of Easter is historically calculated to occur on the first Sunday after the first ecclesiastical full moon falling on or after 21 March. In leap-week calendars, March 21 is less likely to match astronomical spring equinox than in the Gregorian calendar. The Symmetry454 calendar proposes Sunday, April 7 as a permanently fixed date for Easter, based on the median date of the Sunday after the day of the astronomical lunar opposition that is on or after the day of the astronomical northward equinox, calculated for the meridian of Jerusalem. In 1963 the Second Ecumenical Council of the Vatican declared:

"[The Vatican] would not object if the feast of Easter were assigned to a particular Sunday of the Gregorian Calendar... [and] does not oppose efforts designed to introduce a perpetual calendar into civil society."

— Second Ecumenical Council of the Vatican, CONSTITUTION ON THE SACRED LITURGY SACROSANCTUM CONCILIUM SOLEMNLY PROMULGATED BY HIS HOLINESS POPE PAUL VI ON DECEMBER 4, 1963

==== Determining leap weeks ====
In the Pax Calendar, the extra week is added in every year having its last number, or its last two numbers, divisible by 6, and in every year ending with the number 99, and every centennial year not divisible by 400. The Hanke-Henry Permanent Calendar's leap week occurs every year that either begins or ends in a Thursday on the corresponding Gregorian calendar. The Symmetry454 calendar's leap week formula was chosen over others based on 10 criteria, including smoothest distribution of weeks, minimal "jitter" and predicted accuracy of 4-5 millennia.

==== Objections ====
Objections to leap weeks include the inconvenience of a periodic extra week for billing and payment cycles, and for dividing the leap year into halves and quarters. Another objection is that anniversaries, such as birthdays, are more likely on average to occur on a leap week than a leap day.

=== Other options ===
Besides blank-day and leap-week reforms only a few other options for achieving a perennial calendar have been suggested. The Long-Sabbath Calendar, by Rick McCarty (1996), extends to 36 hours the last Saturday of the year and the subsequent first Sunday of the new year. Seventy-two hours are thereby covered with two weekdays instead of the usual three, which shortens the year to 364 calendar days without interrupting the weekday cycle. Another option would trim every year to exactly 364 days, allowing the calendar months to drift relative to the seasons. January would move from mid-winter to mid-summer, in the northern hemisphere, after approximately 150 years. The calendar year can be reckoned to drift though all the seasons once every 294 calendar years equal to 293 years of 365.2423208191 days.

== See also ==
- Annual calendar
- Decimal calendar
- Pax Calendar
- Perpetual calendar
