= ISO week date =

Leap week calendar system

Today (at UTC+00)
- Monday, 19 October 2026
- ISO week date: 2026-W43-1
Other calendars
| Akan | Monodwo |
| Armenian | 1 Trē 1476 |
| Aztec | Izcalli 17, 10 Itzcuintli |
| Babylonian | 6 Tashritu, 2337 SE |
| Balinese pawukon | Menga, Kajeng, Menala, Wage, Maulu, Coma of Dukut, Yama, Erangan, Dewa |
| Bengali | 3 Kartik, BS 1433 |
| Chinese | Yang Fire Tiger・Heart Mansion; Fire Horse Year, Month 9, Day 10 (Hanlu, 4 days until Shuangjiang) |
| Common Era | 19 October 2026 CE |
| Coptic | 9 Paopi, AM 1743 |
| Egyptian | 6 Phamenoth, 2775 NE |
| Ethiopian | 9 Ṭeqemt, 2019 Amätä Məhrät |
| French Republican | Décade III, Septidi de Vendémiaire de l'Année 235 de la République |
| Gregorian | 19 October, AD 2026 |
| Hebrew | 8 Cheshvan, AM 5787 |
| Hindu | Uttarāṣāḍha・Dhṛti; Solar: 2 Kārtika, 1948 SE; Lunisolar: Adhika Aṣṭamī, Śukla pakṣa of Āśvina, 2083 VE; Rāudra・5127 KY・1,872,867 |
| Icelandic | Mánudagur, 26 Haustmánuður 2026 |
| Islamic | 7 Jumada al-awwal, AH 1448 (using tabular method) |
| Japanese | 9 Nagatsuki, Reiwa 8 (Kanro, 4 days until Sōkō) |
| Julian | 6 October, AD 2026 (AM 7535) |
| Julian day | 2461333 |
| Korean | 9 Gaedal, 4359 DE |
| Maya | 13.0.14.0.10; 3 Zac, 10 Oc |
| Roman | Pridie Nonas Octobres, MMDCCLXXIX AUC |
| Solar Hijri | 27 Mehr, SH 1405 |
| Tibetan | 9 tha skar, me pho rta 2153 or 1772 or 1000 |

The ISO week date system is effectively a leap week calendar system that is part of the ISO 8601 date and time standard issued by the International Organization for Standardization (ISO) since 1988 (last revised in 2019) and, before that, it was defined in ISO (R) 2015 since 1971. It is used (mainly) in government and business for fiscal years, as well as in timekeeping. This was previously known as "Industrial date coding". The system specifies a week year atop the Gregorian calendar by defining a notation for ordinal weeks of the year.

The Gregorian leap cycle, which has 97 leap days spread across 400 years, contains a whole number of weeks (20871). In every cycle there are 71 years with an additional 53rd week (corresponding to the Gregorian years that contain 53 Thursdays). An average year is exactly 52.1775 weeks long; months (1/12 year) average at exactly 4.348125 weeks/month.

An ISO week-numbering year (also called ISO year informally) has 52 or 53 full weeks. That is 364 or 371 days instead of the usual 365 or 366 days. These 53-week years occur on all years that have Thursday as 1 January and on leap years that start on Wednesday. The extra week is sometimes referred to as a leap week, although ISO 8601 does not use this term.

Weeks start with Monday and end on Sunday. Each week's year is the Gregorian year in which the Thursday falls. The first week of the year, hence, always contains 4 January. ISO week year numbering therefore usually deviates by 1 from the Gregorian for some days close to 1 January.

Examples of contemporary dates around New Year's Day
| English short | | ISO |
|---|---|---|
| Sat 1 Jan 2005 | 2005-01-01 | 2004-W53-6 |
| Sun 2 Jan 2005 | 2005-01-02 | 2004-W53-7 |
| Sat 31 Dec 2005 | 2005-12-31 | 2005-W52-6 |
| Sun 1 Jan 2006 | 2006-01-01 | 2005-W52-7 |
| Mon 2 Jan 2006 | 2006-01-02 | 2006-W01-1 |
| Sun 31 Dec 2006 | 2006-12-31 | 2006-W52-7 |
| Mon 1 Jan 2007 | 2007-01-01 | 2007-W01-1 |
| Sun 30 Dec 2007 | 2007-12-30 | 2007-W52-7 |
| Mon 31 Dec 2007 | 2007-12-31 | 2008-W01-1 |
| Tue 1 Jan 2008 | 2008-01-01 | 2008-W01-2 |
| Sun 28 Dec 2008 | 2008-12-28 | 2008-W52-7 |
| Mon 29 Dec 2008 | 2008-12-29 | 2009-W01-1 |
| Tue 30 Dec 2008 | 2008-12-30 | 2009-W01-2 |
| Wed 31 Dec 2008 | 2008-12-31 | 2009-W01-3 |
| Thu 1 Jan 2009 | 2009-01-01 | 2009-W01-4 |
| Thu 31 Dec 2009 | 2009-12-31 | 2009-W53-4 |
| Fri 1 Jan 2010 | 2010-01-01 | 2009-W53-5 |
| Sat 2 Jan 2010 | 2010-01-02 | 2009-W53-6 |
| Sun 3 Jan 2010 | 2010-01-03 | 2009-W53-7 |
Notes: Both years 2007 and 2007W start with the same day.; 2008 is a leap year. 2008W is 2 days shorter: 1 day longer at the start, 3 days shorter at the end.; 2009W begins three days before the end of 2008.; 2009W has 53 weeks and ends three days into 2010.

A precise date is specified by the ISO week-numbering year in the format YYYY, a week number in the format ww prefixed by the letter 'W', and the weekday number, a digit d from 1 through 7, beginning with Monday and ending with Sunday. For example, the Gregorian date Monday, 19 October 2026 corresponds to day number 1 in the week number 43 of 2026, and is written as 2026-W43-1 (in extended form) or 2026W431 (in compact form). The ISO year is slightly offset to the Gregorian year; for example, Monday 30 December 2024 in the Gregorian calendar is the first day of week 1 of 2025 in the ISO calendar, and is written as 2025-W01-1 or 2025W011.

== Relation with the Gregorian calendar ==
The ISO week year number deviates from the Gregorian year number in one of three ways. The days differing are a Friday through Sunday, or a Saturday and Sunday, or just a Sunday, at the start of the Gregorian year (which are at the end of the previous ISO year) and a Monday through Wednesday, or a Monday and Tuesday, or just a Monday, at the end of the Gregorian year (which are in week 01 of the next ISO year). In the period 4 January to 28 December, the ISO week year number is always equal to the Gregorian year number. The same is true for every Thursday.

=== First week ===
The ISO 8601 definition for calendar week 01 is the week with the first Thursday of the Gregorian year (i.e., of January) in it. The following definitions based on properties of this week are mutually equivalent, since the ISO week starts with Monday and always has exactly seven days in it:

- It is the first week with a majority (4 or more) of its days in January, i.e. its middle day, Thursday, falls in the beginning year.
- Its first day is the Monday nearest to 1 January.
- It has 4 January in it. Hence the earliest possible first week extends from Monday 29 December (previous Gregorian year) to Sunday 4 January, the latest possible first week extends from Monday 4 January to Sunday 10 January.
- It has the year's first working day in it, if Saturdays, Sundays and 1 January are not working days.

As a corollary for 1 January, this means:

- If it is on a Monday, Tuesday, Wednesday or Thursday, it is in W01.
- If it is on a Friday, it is part of W53 of the previous year.
- If it is on a Saturday, it is part of the last week of the previous year which is numbered W52 in a common year and W53 in a leap year.
- If it is on a Sunday, it is part of W52 of the previous year.

Week date peculiarities at the beginning and end of a year
| DL | Days at the start of January | | | | | | | First date | | Leap day | Last date | | | Days at the end of December | | | | | | |
| DL | Mo | Tu | We | Th | Fr | Sa | Su | W01-1 | Jan01 | Feb29 | Dec31 | W52-7 | W53-7 | Mo | Tu | We | Th | Fr | Sa | Su |
|---|---|---|---|---|---|---|---|---|---|---|---|---|---|---|---|---|---|---|---|---|
| G | 01 | 02 | 03 | 04 | 05 | 06 | 07 | Jan01 | W01-1 | —N/a | W01-1 | Dec30 | —N/a | 31 | | | | | | |
| GF | 01 | 02 | 03 | 04 | 05 | 06 | 07 | Jan01 | W01-1 | W09-4 | W01-2 | Dec29 | —N/a | 30 | 31 | | | | | |
| F | | 01 | 02 | 03 | 04 | 05 | 06 | Dec31 | W01-2 | —N/a | W01-2 | Dec29 | —N/a | 30 | 31 | | | | | |
| FE | | 01 | 02 | 03 | 04 | 05 | 06 | Dec31 | W01-2 | W09-5 | W01-3 | Dec28 | —N/a | 29 | 30 | 31 | | | | |
| E | | | 01 | 02 | 03 | 04 | 05 | Dec30 | W01-3 | —N/a | W01-3 | Dec28 | —N/a | 29 | 30 | 31 | | | | |
| ED | | | 01 | 02 | 03 | 04 | 05 | Dec30 | W01-3 | W09-6 | W53-4 | Dec27 | Jan03 | 28 | 29 | 30 | 31 | | | |
| D | | | | 01 | 02 | 03 | 04 | Dec29 | W01-4 | —N/a | W53-4 | Dec27 | Jan03 | 28 | 29 | 30 | 31 | | | |
| DC | | | | 01 | 02 | 03 | 04 | Dec29 | W01-4 | W09-7 | W53-5 | Dec26 | Jan02 | 27 | 28 | 29 | 30 | 31 | | |
| C | | | | | 01 | 02 | 03 | Jan04 | W53-5 | —N/a | W52-5 | Jan02 | —N/a | 27 | 28 | 29 | 30 | 31 | | |
| CB | | | | | 01 | 02 | 03 | Jan04 | W53-5 | W09-1 | W52-6 | Jan01 | —N/a | 26 | 27 | 28 | 29 | 30 | 31 | |
| B | | | | | | 01 | 02 | Jan03 | W5x-6 (Note: 1 January is usually in W52 in common years starting on Saturday (B) when preceded by a common year starting on Friday (C), but in W53 if the previous year was a leap year starting on Thursday (DC).) | —N/a | W52-6 | Jan01 | —N/a | 26 | 27 | 28 | 29 | 30 | 31 | |
| BA | | | | | | 01 | 02 | Jan03 | W52-6 | W09-2 | W52-7 | Dec31 | —N/a | 25 | 26 | 27 | 28 | 29 | 30 | 31 |
| A | | | | | | | 01 | Jan02 | W52-7 | —N/a | W52-7 | Dec31 | —N/a | 25 | 26 | 27 | 28 | 29 | 30 | 31 |
| AG | | | | | | | 01 | Jan02 | W52-7 | W09-3 | W01-1 | Dec30 | —N/a | 31 | | | | | | |
| | Earliest week with days in the year | | | | | | | First week (Note: First day of the initial or first week of the year.) | First month (Note: First day of the initial or first month of the year.) | Extra day | Last month (Note: Last day of the final or last month of the year.) | Last week (Note: Last day of the final or last week of the year.) | | Latest week with days in the year | | | | | | |

=== Last week ===
The last week of the ISO week-numbering year, i.e. W52 or W53, is the week before W01 of the next year. This week's properties are:

- It has the year's last Thursday in it.
- It is the last week with a majority (4 or more) of its days in December, i.e. its middle day, Thursday, falls in the ending year.
- Its last day is the Sunday nearest to 31 December.
- It has 28 December in it. Hence the earliest possible final week extends from Monday 22 December to Sunday 28 December, the latest possible final week extends from Monday 28 December to Sunday 3 January (following Gregorian year).

As a corollary for 31 December, this means:

- If it is on a Monday, Tuesday, or Wednesday it is in W01 of the next year.
- If it is on a Thursday, it is in W53 of the year just ending.
- If it is on a Friday it is the final week of the year just ending, which is W52 in common years and W53 in leap years.
- If it is on a weekend, i.e. Saturday or Sunday, it is in W52 of the year just ending.

Summary of last weeks
| First day | | Year type | | | | | |
| Jan01 | W01-1 | Common year (365 − 1 or + 6) | | | Leap year (366 − 2 or + 5) | | |
|---|---|---|---|---|---|---|---|
| Mon | Jan01 | G | +0 | −1 | GF | +0 | −2 |
| Tue | Dec31 | F | +1 | −2 | FE | +1 | −3 |
| Wed | Dec30 | E | +2 | −3 | ED | +2 | +3 |
| Thu | Dec29 | D | +3 | +3 | DC | +3 | +2 |
| Fri | Jan04 | C | −3 | +2 | CB | −3 | +1 |
| Sat | Jan03 | B | −2 | +1 | BA | −2 | +0 |
| Sun | Jan02 | A | −1 | +0 | AG | −1 | −1 |

=== Weeks per year ===
The long years, with 53 weeks in them, can be described by any of the following equivalent definitions:

- any year starting on Thursday (dominical letter D or DC) and any leap year starting on Wednesday (ED)
- any year ending on Thursday (D, ED) and any leap year ending on Friday (DC)
- years in which 1 January or 31 December is a Thursday, or both are

All other week-numbering years are short years and have 52 weeks.

The number of weeks in a given year is equal to the corresponding week number of 28 December, because it is the only date that is always in the last week of the year since it is a week before 4 January which is always in the first week of the following year.

Using only the ordinal year number y, the number of weeks in that year can be determined from a function, $p(y)$, that returns the day of the week of 31 December:

$$\begin{align}
p(y) &= \left(y + \left\lfloor\frac{y}4\right\rfloor - \left\lfloor\frac{y}{100}\right\rfloor + \left\lfloor\frac{y}{400} \right\rfloor \right) \bmod 7\\
\text{weeks}(y) &= 52 + \begin{cases}
1 \text{ (long)} & \text{if } p(y) = 4 \text{, i.e. current year ends Thursday}\\
& \text{or } p(y-1) = 3 \text{, i.e. previous year ends Wednesday} \\
0 \text{ (short)} & \text{otherwise}
\end{cases}
\end{align}$$

Long years per 400-year leap-cycle, highlighted ones also have 29 Feb in them; adding 2000 gives current year numbers
| Subcycle | +6 | +5 | +6 | +5 | +6 |
|---|---|---|---|---|---|
| 28_{1} | 004 | 009 | 015 | 020 | 026 |
| 28_{2} | 032 | 037 | 043 | 048 | 054 |
| 28_{3} | 060 | 065 | 071 | 076 | 082 |
| 40_{1} | 088 | 093 | 099 | | |
| 40_{1} | | 105 | 111 | 116 | 122 |
| 28_{4} | 128 | 133 | 139 | 144 | 150 |
| 28_{5} | 156 | 161 | 167 | 172 | 178 |
| 40_{2} | 184 | 189 | 195 | | |
| 40_{2} | | 201 | 207 | 212 | 218 |
| 28_{6} | 224 | 229 | 235 | 240 | 246 |
| 28_{7} | 252 | 257 | 263 | 268 | 274 |
| 40_{3} | 280 | 285 | 291 | 296 | |
| 40_{3} | | | 303 | 308 | 314 |
| 28_{8} | 320 | 325 | 331 | 336 | 342 |
| 28_{9} | 348 | 353 | 359 | 364 | 370 |
| 28_{10} | 376 | 381 | 387 | 392 | 398 |

On average, a year has 53 weeks every 400/71 = 5.6338... years; there are 43 times when these long years are 6 years apart, 27 times when they are 5 years apart, and once they are 7 years apart (between years 296 and 303). The Gregorian years corresponding to these 71 long years can be subdivided as follows:

- 27 Gregorian leap years, emphasized in the list above:
  - 13 starting on Thursday, hence ending on Friday, and
  - 14 starting on Wednesday, hence ending on Thursday;
- 44 Gregorian common years starting, hence also ending on Thursday.

The Gregorian years corresponding to the other 329 short years (neither starting nor ending with Thursday) can also be subdivided as follows:

- 70 are Gregorian leap years.
- 259 are Gregorian common years.

Thus, within a 400-year cycle:

- 27 week years are 5 days longer than the month years (371 − 366), 6.75%.
- 44 week years are 6 days longer than the month years (371 − 365), 11%.
- 70 week years are 2 days shorter than the month years (364 − 366), 17.5%.
- 259 week years are 1 day shorter than the month years (364 − 365), 64.75%.

The table shows the long years in a 400-year cycle. There are 28 years, i.e. a Julian solar cycle, between long years in the same column except when the century changes, when there are 40 years between the long years in the next century and the last completely filled row (or subcycle) of the previous century. There are ten regular subcycles of 28 years each and three subcycles of 40 years each. The 40-year subcycles 085–124 and 181–220 are equal, but the middle long year within the subcycle 277–316 would have to occur in 297 instead of 296 to be also the same. This illustrates the only, abnormal 7-year gap between long years.

=== Weeks per month ===
The ISO standard does not define any association of weeks to months. A date is either expressed with a month and day-of-the-month, or with a week and day-of-the-week, never a mix.

Weeks are a prominent entity in accounting where annual statistics benefit from regularity throughout the years. Therefore, a fixed length of 13 weeks per quarter is usually chosen in practice. These quarters may then be subdivided into 5 + 4 + 4 weeks, 4 + 5 + 4 weeks or 4 + 4 + 5 weeks. The final quarter has 14 weeks in it when there are 53 weeks in the year.

When it is necessary to allocate a week to a single month, the rule for first week of the year might be applied, although ISO 8601-1 does not consider this case explicitly. The resulting pattern would be irregular. There would be 4 months of 5 weeks per normal, 52-week year, or 5 such months in a long, 53-week year. Although the days of a month (except February) always belong to 5 and sometimes 6 different weeks, there would never be 6 weeks belonging to a single month. The 5-week months would meet one of the following three criteria:

- The first day of the month is a ...
  - Thursday and the month has 29 through 31 days.
  - Wednesday and the month has 30 or 31 days.
  - Tuesday and the month has 31 days, ending on a Thursday.
- Equivalently, the last day of the month is a ...
  - Thursday and it is not the 28th.
  - Friday and it is not in February.
  - Saturday and it is the 31st.

=== Dates with fixed week number ===
Overview of dates with a fixed week number
| Month | Days | | | | | Weeks |
|---|---|---|---|---|---|---|
| January | 04 | 11 | 18 | 25 | | W01 – W04 |
| February | 01 | 08 | 15 | 22 | 29 | W05 – W09 |
Later dates differ in any leap year starting on Thursday:
| March | 01 | 08 | 15 | 22 | 29 | W09 – W13 |
| April | 05 | 12 | 19 | 26 | | W14 – W17 |
| May | 03 | 10 | 17 | 24 | 31 | W18 – W22 |
| June | 07 | 14 | 21 | 28 | | W23 – W26 |
| July | 05 | 12 | 19 | 26 | | W27 – W30 |
| August | 02 | 09 | 16 | 23 | 30 | W31 – W35 |
| September | 06 | 13 | 20 | 27 | | W36 – W39 |
| October | 04 | 11 | 18 | 25 | | W40 – W43 |
| November | 01 | 08 | 15 | 22 | 29 | W44 – W48 |
| December | 06 | 13 | 20 | 27 | | W49 – W52 |

For all years, 8 days have a fixed ISO week number (between W01 and W08) in January and February. With the exception of leap years starting on Thursday, dates with fixed week numbers occur in all months of the year (for 1 day of each ISO week W01 to W52).

During leap years starting on Thursday (i.e. the 13 years numbered 004, 032, 060, 088, 128, 156, 184, 224, 252, 280, 320, 348, 376 in a 400-year cycle), the ISO week numbers are incremented by 1 from March to the rest of the year. This last occurred in 2004, and will next occur in 2032 and 2060. These exceptions are happening between years that are most often 28 years apart, or 40 years apart for 3 pairs of successive years: from year 088 to 128, from year 184 to 224, and from year 280 to 320. They will never be 12 years apart. The only leap years that can occur 12 years apart are leap years starting on Sunday, Tuesday, Wednesday and Friday.

The day of the week for these days are related to the "Doomsday" algorithm, which calculates the weekday that the last day of February falls on. The dates listed in the table are all one day after the Doomsday, except that in January and February of leap years the dates themselves are Doomsdays. In leap years, the week number is the rank number of its Doomsday.

=== Equal weeks ===
Some pairs and triplets of ISO weeks have the same days of the month:

- W02 and W41 in common years
- W03 with W42 in common years and with W15 and W28 in leap years
- W04 and W43 in common years and with W16 and W29 in leap years
- W05 and W44 in common years
- W06 with W10 and W45 in common years and with W32 in leap years
- W07 with W11 and W46 in common years and with W33 in leap years
- W08 with W12 and W47 in common years and with W34 in leap years
- W10 and W45
- W11 and W46
- W12 and W47
- W15 and W28
- W16 and W29
- W37 and W50
- W38 and W51

Some other weeks, i.e. W09, W19 through W26 and W35 never share their days of the month ordinals with any other week of the same year.

== Advantages ==
- All weeks have exactly 7 days, i.e. there are no fractional weeks.
- Every week belongs to a single year, i.e. there are no ambiguous or double-assigned weeks.
- The date directly tells the weekday.
- All week-numbering years start with a Monday and end with a Sunday.
- When used by itself without using the concept of month, all week-numbering years are the same except that some years have a week 53 at the end.
- The weeks are the same as used with the Gregorian calendar.

== Differences to other calendars ==
Solar astronomic phenomena, such as equinoxes and solstices, vary in the Gregorian calendar over a range spanning three days, over the course of each 400-year cycle, while the ISO Week Date calendar has a range spanning 9 days. For example, there are March equinoxes on 1920-W12-6 and 2077-W11-5 in UT.

The year number of the ISO week very often differs from the Gregorian year number for dates close to 1 January. For example, 29 December 2025 is ISO 2026-W01-1, i.e. it is in "week year" 2026 instead of 2025. Confusing these two year numbers has caused some software bugs.

The ISO week calendar relies on the Gregorian calendar, which it augments, to define the new year day (Monday of week 01). As a result, the 71 extra weeks are spread across the 400-year cycle in a complex, seemingly random pattern. Most calendar reform proposals using leap week designs strive to simplify and harmonize this pattern, some by choosing a separate rule (e.g. every 5th year except every 40th unless it's the 400th), others by introducing a different leap cycle (e.g. 52 extra weeks in 293 years).

Although ISO specifies which year a week belongs to, it does not explicitly apply the same rule to months, whereas some alternative calendar designs assign each week to a particular month systematically.

Not all parts of the world consider the week to begin with Monday. For example, in some Muslim countries, the normal work week begins on Saturday, while in Israel it begins on Sunday. In much of the Americas, although the work week is usually defined to start on Monday, the calendar week is often considered to start on Sunday.

== Algorithms ==
=== Calculating the week number from an ordinal date ===
The week number (WW or woy for week of year) of any date can be calculated, given its ordinal date (i.e. day of the year, doy or DDD, 1–365 or 366) and its day of the week (D or dow, 1–7). When using serial numbers for dates (e.g. in spreadsheets), doy is the serial number for a date minus the serial number for 31 December of the previous year, or alternatively minus the serial number for 1 January the same year plus one.

Algorithm

1. Subtract the weekday number from the ordinal day of the year.
2. Add 10.
3. Divide by 7, discard the remainder.
  - If the week number thus obtained equals 0, it means that the given date belongs to the preceding (week-based) year.
  - If a week number of 53 is obtained, one must check that the date is not actually in week 1 of the following year.

Formula
$$\begin{align}
y &= \text{year}(date)\\
w &= \left\lfloor \frac{10 + \text{doy}(date) - \text{dow}(date)}{7} \right\rfloor \\
\text{woy}(date) &= \begin{cases}
\text{weeks}(y-1), & \text{if }w<1 \\
1,  & \text{if }w>\text{weeks}(y) \\
w, & \text{otherwise.}
\end{cases} \\
\text{woy}(date) &\in [1, 53] \\
\text{doy}(date) &\in [1, 366] \\
\text{dow}(date) &\in [1, 7]\\
\text{weeks}(year) &\in [52, 53]\\
\end{align}$$

=== Calculating the week number from a month and day of the month ===
If the ordinal date is not known, it can be computed from the month (MM or moy) and day of the month (DD or dom) by any of several methods; e.g. using a table such as the following.

Offset for the day of the month to get ordinal day of the year
| Month | Jan | Feb | Mar | Apr | May | Jun | Jul | Aug | Sep | Oct | Nov | Dec | Add |
|---|---|---|---|---|---|---|---|---|---|---|---|---|---|
| Common year | 0 | 31 | 59 | 90 | 120 | 151 | 181 | 212 | 243 | 273 | 304 | 334 | dom |
| Leap year | 0 | 31 | 60 | 91 | 121 | 152 | 182 | 213 | 244 | 274 | 305 | 335 | dom |

Example
Find the week number of Saturday 5 November 2016 (leap year):
- Find the ordinal day number first:

moy = 11
dom = 5
leap = 1
add = 305, from table lookup
doy = 305 + 5 = 310.

- Alternatively, use spreadsheet serial day numbers instead:

off = 42369, i.e. 31 December 2015
day = 42679
doy = 42679 − 42369 = 310.

- Finally, find the week number:

dow = 6, i.e. Saturday
woy = (10 + 310 − 6) div 7
woy = (320 − 6) div 7
woy = 314 div 7 = 44.

=== Calculating an ordinal or month date from a week date ===
Algorithm

1. Multiply the week number by 7.
2. Then add the weekday number.
3. From this sum subtract the correction for the year:
  - Get the weekday of 4 January.
  - Add 3.
4. The result is the ordinal date, which can be converted into a calendar date.
  - If the ordinal date thus obtained is zero or negative, the date belongs to the previous calendar year;
  - if it is greater than the number of days in the year, it belongs to the following year.

Formula
$$\begin{align}
y &= \text{year}(date)\\
d &= \text{woy}(date) \times 7 + \text{dow}(date) - (\text{dow}(y, 1, 4) + 3) \\
\text{doy}(date) &= \begin{cases}
d + \text{days}(y-1), & \text{if }d < 1 \\
d - \text{days}(y), & \text{if }d > \text{days}(y)\\
d, & \text{otherwise.}
\end{cases} \\
\text{days}(year) &\in [365, 366]\\
\end{align}$$

== Other week numbering systems ==
ISO week numbering is the predominant system used worldwide. Where alternative definitions are in place, it is unusual to count weeks of the year, i.e. ordinal calendar week numbers almost always follow the international standard, although software implementations thereof have frequently been incorrect for edge cases.

The US system has weeks from Sunday through Saturday, and partial weeks at the beginning and the end of the year, i.e. 52 full and 1 partial week of 1 or 2 days if the year starts on Sunday or ends on Saturday, 52 full and 2 single-day weeks if a leap year starts on Saturday and ends on Sunday, otherwise 51 full and 2 partial weeks. An advantage is that no separate year numbering like the ISO year is needed. Correspondence of lexicographical order and chronological order is preserved (just like with the ISO year-week-weekday numbering), but partial weeks make some computations of weekly statistics or payments inaccurate at the end of December or the beginning of January or both.

The US broadcast calendar designates the week containing 1 January (and starting Monday) as the first of the year, but otherwise works like ISO week numbering without partial weeks. Up to six days of the previous December may be part of the first week of the year.

A mix of those, wherein weeks start Sunday and "containing 1 January" defines the first week, is used in US accounting, resulting in a system with years having also 52 or 53 weeks.
