= Intercalation (timekeeping) =

Insertion of a leap day, week, or month

Intercalation or embolism in timekeeping is the insertion of a leap day, week, or month into some calendar years to make the calendar follow the seasons or moon phases more accurately.

== Solar calendars ==
The solar or tropical year does not have a whole number of days (it is about 365.24 days), but a calendar year must have a whole number of days. The most common way to reconcile the two is to vary the number of days in the calendar year.

In solar calendars, this is done by adding an extra day, called a leap day or intercalary day, to a common year of 365 days, about once every four years, creating a leap year that has 366 days (Julian, Gregorian and Indian national calendars).

The Decree of Canopus, issued by the pharaoh Ptolemy III Euergetes of Ancient Egypt in 239 BC, decreed a solar leap day system; an Egyptian leap year was not adopted until 25 BC, when the Roman Emperor Augustus instituted a reformed Alexandrian calendar.

In the Julian calendar, as well as in the Gregorian calendar, which improved upon it, intercalation is done by adding an extra day to February in each leap year. In the Julian calendar this was done every four years. In the Gregorian, years divisible by 100 but not 400 were exempted in order to improve accuracy. Thus, 2000 was a leap year, but 1700, 1800, and 1900 were not.

Epagomenal (Note: From ἐπαγόμενος, epagomenos (present participle passive of ἐπάγειν, epagein "to bring in") + -al.) days are days within a solar calendar that are outside any regular month. Usually five epagomenal days are included within every year (Egyptian and Mayan Haab' calendars), but a sixth epagomenal day is intercalated every four years in some (Coptic, Ethiopian and French Republican Calendars). They are usually positioned collectively at the end of the year, but some calendars spread epagomenal days throughout the year, often between seasons. The Bahá'í calendar includes enough epagomenal days (usually 4 or 5) before the last month (علاء, ʿalāʾ) to ensure that the following year starts on the March equinox. These are known as the Ayyám-i-Há.

Each year of the "Persian" solar Hijri calendar, used in Iran and Afghanistan, begins on the day of the spring equinox as observed in Tehran. If the exact moment of astronomical equinox occurs before noon (Tehran time), that day is declared to be Nowruz, the first day of the new year. If the equinox occurs after noon, the following day is designated as Nowruz. Thus, although the calendar has no formal intercalation, (Note: a process that is forbidden in Islam, as Nasi'#Prohibition under Islam explains) it has years of 365 or 366 days.

== Lunisolar calendars ==
The solar year does not have a whole number of lunar months (it is about 365/29.5 = 12.37 lunations), so a lunisolar calendar must have a variable number of months per year. Regular years have 12 months, but embolismic years insert a 13th leap month ("intercalary" or "embolismic" month) every second or third year. Whether to insert an intercalary month in a given year may be determined using regular cycles such as the 19-year Metonic cycle (Hebrew calendar and in the determination of Easter) or using calculations of lunar phases (Hindu lunisolar and Chinese calendars). The Buddhist calendar adds both an intercalary day and month on a usually regular cycle.

== Lunar calendars ==
In principle, lunar calendars do not employ intercalation because they do not seek to synchronise with the seasons, and the motion of the moon is astronomically predictable. But religious lunar calendars rely on actual observation.

The Lunar Hijri calendar, the purely lunar calendar observed by most of Islam for religious use, depends on actual observation of the first crescent of the moon and thus has no intercalation. Each month still has either 29 or 30 days, but due to the variable method of observations employed, there is usually no discernible order in the sequencing of 29- or 30-day month lengths. Traditionally, the first day of each month is the day (beginning at sunset) of the first sighting of the hilal (crescent moon) shortly after sunset. If the hilal is not observed immediately after the 29th day of a month (either because clouds block its view or because the western sky is still too bright when the moon sets), then the day that begins at that sunset is the 30th.

The tabular Islamic calendar, a rule-based variation of the lunar Hijri calendar, is used both to predict the new moon and to convert historical dates. It has 12 lunar months that alternate between 30 and 29 days in common years but, 11 times in a 30-year cycle, has an intercalary day at the end of the last month of the year.

== Leap seconds ==
From 1972 to 2016, the International Earth Rotation and Reference Systems Service occasionally inserted a leap second into UTC to re-establish is relationship with UT1. These are sometimes described as intercalary seconds.

== Other uses ==
ISO 8601 includes a specification for a 52/53-week year. Any year that has 53 Thursdays has 53 weeks; this extra week may be regarded as intercalary, i.e. a leap week.

The xiuhpōhualli (year count) system of the Aztec calendar had five intercalary days after the eighteenth and final month, the nēmontēmi, in which the people fasted and reflected on the past year.

== See also ==
- Lunisolar calendar
- Egyptian, Coptic, and Ethiopian calendars
- Iranian calendar
- Islamic calendar
- Mandaean calendar
- Celtic calendar
- Thai lunar calendar
- Bengali calendar
- Igbo calendar
- World Calendar
- Intercalated Games
