= International Fixed Calendar =

13-month calendar where every date is fixed to a day of the week

The International Fixed Calendar (also known as the Cotsworth plan, the Cotsworth calendar, the Eastman plan or the Yearal) was a proposed reform of the Gregorian calendar designed by Moses B. Cotsworth, first presented in 1902. The International Fixed Calendar divides the year into 13 months of 28 days each. A type of perennial calendar, every date is fixed to the same weekday every year. Though it was never officially adopted at the country level, the entrepreneur George Eastman instituted its use at the Eastman Kodak Company in 1928, where it was used until 1989. While it is sometimes described as the 13-month calendar or the equal-month calendar, various alternative calendar designs share these features.

== Rules ==
The calendar year has 13 months with 28 days each, divided into exactly 4 weeks (13 × 28 = 364). An extra day added as a holiday at the end of the year (after December 28, i.e. equal to December 31 Gregorian), sometimes called "Year Day", does not belong to any week and brings the total to 365 days. Each year coincides with the corresponding Gregorian year, so January 1 in the Cotsworth calendar always falls on Gregorian January 1. (Note: See the table in Cotsworth 1905, p. i) Twelve months are named and ordered the same as those of the Gregorian calendar, except that the extra month is inserted between June and July, and called Sol. Situated in mid-summer (from the point of view of its Northern Hemisphere authors) and including the mid-year solstice, the name of the new month was chosen in homage to the sun.

Leap years in the International Fixed Calendar contain 366 days, and its occurrence follows the Gregorian rule. There is a leap year in every year whose number is divisible by 4, but not if the year number is divisible by 100, unless it is also divisible by 400. So although the year 2000 was a leap year, the years 1700, 1800, and 1900 were common years. The International Fixed Calendar inserts the extra day in leap years as June 29 – between Saturday June 28 and Sunday Sol 1. Each month begins on a Sunday, and ends on a Saturday; consequently, every year begins on Sunday. Neither Year Day nor leap day are considered to be part of any week; they are preceded by a Saturday and are followed by a Sunday, making a long weekend.

As a result, a particular day usually has a different day of the week in the IFC than in all traditional calendars that contain a seven-day week. The IFC is, however, almost compatible with the World Calendar in this regard, because it also starts Sunday and has the extra day at the end of the year and the leap day in the middle, except IFC leaps on Gregorian June 17 and TWC leaps two weeks later on July 1. Since this break of the ancient week cycle has been a major concern raised against its adoption, various leap week calendars have been proposed as a solution.

Common arrangement of all months
Days of the week
Sun	Mon	Tue	Wed	Thu	Fri	Sat	Hol
01	02	03	04	05	06	07	Leap Day, Year Day
08	09	10	11	12	13	14	Leap Day, Year Day
15	16	17	18	19	20	21	Leap Day, Year Day
22	23	24	25	26	27	28	X*

* The two special dates have been recorded as either the 29th day of the month ending or the 0th day of the month beginning, or, more correctly, as outside any month and week with no ordinal number.

The date for 21 November 2026, using this calendar is Tuesday, 17 November 2026.

The following table shows how the 13 months and extra days of the International Fixed Calendar occur in relation to the dates of the Gregorian calendar:

IFC	Matching dates on the Gregorian calendar	
IFC	Starts on fixed day 1	Ends on fixed day 28
January	January 1	January 28
February	January 29	February 25
March	February 26	March 25*
April	March 26*	April 22*
May	April 23*	May 20*
June	May 21*	June 17*
Leap Day*	June 17	
Sol	June 18	July 15
July	July 16	August 12
August	August 13	September 9
September	September 10	October 7
October	October 8	November 4
November	November 5	December 2
December	December 3	December 30
Year Day	December 31	

* In a leap year, these Gregorian dates between March and June are a day earlier. March in the Fixed Calendar always has a fixed number of days (28), and includes a potential Gregorian February 29. The rule for finding leap years is the same in both calendars.

== History ==
Lunisolar calendars, with fixed weekdays, existed in many ancient cultures, with certain holidays always falling on the same dates of the month and days of the week.

The idea of a 13-month perennial calendar has been around since at least the middle of the 18th century. Versions of the idea differ mainly on how the months are named, and the treatment of the extra day in leap year.

The "Georgian calendar" was proposed in 1745 by Reverend Hugh Jones, an American colonist from Maryland writing under the pen name Hirossa Ap-Iccim. The author named the plan, and the thirteenth month, after King George II of Great Britain. The 365th day each year was to be set aside as Christmas. The treatment of leap year varied from the Gregorian rule, however, and the year would begin closer to the winter solstice. In a later version of the plan, published in 1753, the 13 months were all renamed for Christian saints.

In 1849 the French philosopher Auguste Comte (1798–1857) proposed the 13-month Positivist Calendar, naming the months: Moses, Homer, Aristotle, Archimedes, Caesar, St Paul, Charlemagne, Dante, Gutenberg, Shakespeare, Descartes, Frederic and Bichat. The days of the year were likewise dedicated to "saints" in the Positivist Religion of Humanity. Positivist weeks, months, and years begin with Monday instead of Sunday. Comte also reset the year number, beginning the era of his calendar (year 1) with the Gregorian year 1789. For the extra days of the year not belonging to any week or month, Comte followed the pattern of Ap-Iccim (Jones), ending each year with a festival on the 365th day, followed by a subsequent feast day occurring only in leap years.

Whether Moses Cotsworth was familiar with the 13-month plans that preceded his International Fixed Calendar is not known. He did follow Ap-Iccim (Jones) in designating the 365th day of the year as Christmas. His suggestion was that this last day of the year should be designated a Sunday, and hence, because the following day would be New Year's Day and a Sunday also, he called it a Double Sunday. Since Cotsworth's goal was a simplified, more "rational" calendar for business and industry, he would carry over all the features of the Gregorian calendar consistent with this goal, including the traditional month names, the week beginning on Sunday (still traditionally used in US, but uncommon in Europe and in the ISO week standard, starting their weeks on Monday), and the Gregorian leap-year rule.

To promote Cotsworth's calendar reform the International Fixed Calendar League, was founded in 1923, just after the plan was selected by the League of Nations as the best of 130 calendar proposals put forward. Sir Sandford Fleming, the inventor and driving force behind worldwide adoption of standard time, became the first president of the IFCL. The League opened offices in London and later in Rochester, New York. George Eastman of the Eastman Kodak Company, became a fervent supporter of the IFC, and instituted its use at Kodak. Some organized opposition to the proposed reform came from rabbi Joseph Hertz, who argued that leap days (creating an eight-day week) would force the Jewish Sabbath (observed on the seventh day of the week) to cycle throughout the week. Sol Bloom (NY-D) criticised the proposed reform before the U.S. House of Representatives. Shortly after its plan failed to win final approval by the League of Nations in 1937, the International Fixed Calendar League ceased operations.

== See also ==
- Calendar reform
- ISO week date
- Leap week calendar
- Positivist calendar
- World Calendar
