= World Calendar =

Proposed reform of Gregorian calendar

The World Calendar is a proposed reform of the Gregorian calendar created by Elisabeth Achelis of Brooklyn, New York in 1930.

== Features ==
The World Calendar is a 12-month, perennial calendar with equal quarters.

Each quarter begins on a Sunday and ends on a Saturday. The quarters are equal: each has exactly 91 days, 13 weeks, or 3 months. The three months in each quarter have 31, 30, and 30 days respectively. Each quarter begins with the 31-day months of January, April, July, or October.

The World Calendar also has the following two additional days to maintain the same new year days as the Gregorian calendar.

Worldsday
The last day of the year following Saturday 30 December. This additional day is dated "W" and named Worldsday, a year-end world holiday. It is followed by Sunday, 1 January in the new year.
Leapyear Day
This day is similarly added at the end of the second quarter in leap years. It is also dated "W" and named Leapyear Day. It is followed by Sunday, 1 July within the same year.

The World Calendar treats Worldsday and Leapyear Day as a 24-hour waiting period before resuming the calendar again. These off-calendar days, also known as "intercalary days", are not assigned weekday designations. They are intended to be treated as holidays.

Because any three-month sequence repeats with the same arrangement of days, the World Calendar can be expressed concisely:

World Calendar months layout, repeating each quarter-year
	1st month					2nd month				3rd month				W
Q1	January					February				March				
Q2	April					May				June				
Q3	July					August				September				
Q4	October					November				December				
Su	01	08	15	22	29	05	12	19	26	03	10	17	24	
Mo	02	09	16	23	30	06	13	20	27	04	11	18	25	
Tu	03	10	17	24	31	07	14	21	28	05	12	19	26	
We	04	11	18	25	01	08	15	22	29	06	13	20	27	
Th	05	12	19	26	02	09	16	23	30	07	14	21	28	
Fr	06	13	20	27	03	10	17	24	01	08	15	22	29	
Sa	07	14	21	28	04	11	18	25	02	09	16	23	30	
W	Worldsday follows December; Leapyear Day follows June													W

== Background and history ==
The World Calendar has its roots in the proposed calendar of the Abbot Marco Mastrofini, a proposal to reform the Gregorian calendar year so that it would always begin on Sunday, 1 January, and would contain equal quarters of 91 days each. The 365th day of the solar cycle would be a year-end, "intercalary" and optionally holiday. In leap years, a second "intercalary day" follows Saturday, 30 June.

Around 1887 French astronomer Gaston Armelin proposed a calendar based on this idea and roughly identical to the World Calendar.

Elisabeth Achelis founded The World Calendar Association (TWCA) in 1930 with the goal of worldwide adoption of the World Calendar. It functioned for most of the next twenty-five years as The World Calendar Association, Inc. Throughout the 1930s, support for the concept grew in the League of Nations, the precursor of the United Nations. Achelis started the Journal of Calendar Reform in 1931, publishing it for twenty-five years, and wrote five books on the calendar concept.

Following World War II, Achelis solicited worldwide support for the World Calendar. As the movement gained international appeal with legislation introduced in the United States Congress, awaiting international decisions, Achelis accepted advice that the United Nations was the proper body to act on calendar reform. At the United Nations in 1955, the United States significantly delayed universal adoption by withholding support "unless such a reform were favoured by a substantial majority of the citizens of the United States acting through their representatives in the Congress of the United States." Also, Achelis wrote in 1955 (JCR Vol. 25, page 169), "While Affiliates and Committees have over the years and still are able to approach all branches of their governments, the Incorporated (International) Association was prevented from seeking legislation in the United States lest it lose its tax exempt status. Because of this I have been prevented from doing in my own country that which I have been urging all other Affiliates to do in theirs."

By 1956, she dissolved The World Calendar Association, Incorporated. It continued as the International World Calendar Association through the rest of the century with several directors including Molly E. Kalkstein, who is related to Achelis, and who provided the Association's first official website during her 2000–2004 tenure. The association reorganised in 2005 as The World Calendar Association, International. It was last active in 2013 as it had resumed efforts towards adoption of the World Calendar in 2017 and 2023. The World Calendar Association's last director was Wayne Edward Richardson of Ellinwood, Kansas, who died on 29 May 2020.

== Reception ==
=== Benefits ===
As with other calendar reform proposals, supporters point out several benefits to the World Calendar over the current Gregorian calendar.

Proponents refer to its simple structure. Each day is assigned an exact, repetitive date relative to week and month. Quarterly statistics are easier to compare, since the four-quarters are the same length each year. Economic savings occur from less need to print calendars because only the year number changes. Work and school schedules do not need to unnecessarily reinvent themselves, at great expense, year after year. The World Calendar can be memorised by anyone and used similarly to a clock.

Because the World Calendar is perpetual, there is no need to churn out copies of it every year. Dates in the World Calendar occur with no more than two days difference from Gregorian calendar dates.

=== Religious objections ===
The main opponents of the World Calendar in the 20th century were leaders of religions that worship according to a seven-day cycle. For Jews, Christians and Muslims, particular days of worship are ancient and fundamental elements of their faith.

Jews observe Saturday as Shabbat, on the basis of the Decalogue's injunction to "remember the sabbath day, to keep it holy" (Exodus 20:8). Most Christians worship on Sunday, the Lord's Day, on which they believe Christ rose from the dead. Muslims perform the jumu'ah prayer in Mosques on Fridays, the day they believe Adam was created. Likewise, Seventh-day Adventists are required to worship every Saturday.

Adherents of these religions object that intercalary days are counted outside the usual seven-day week and disrupt the traditional weekly cycle. A week with a Worldsday would be eight days long. Some adherents of these religions insist that they would have to continue observing their holidays every seventh day, causing the worship days to drift by one day each year (two on a leap year), relative to the World Calendar week. The day of rest would then no longer coincide with the weekend.

These concerns played a role in the United States government's decision, at the United Nations, in 1955, not to recommend further study.

=== International standards ===
The World Calendar, unlike some other proposals, is not compatible with the international standard ISO 8601, which is based upon, but differs from, the Gregorian calendar. They differ regarding the first weekday of the week (Sunday vs. Monday), and ISO 8601 does not support intercalary dates (e.g. in notation). The World Calendar, however, modifies the Gregorian calendar less than other calendar reform proposals to achieve the sought after improvements of a simpler and perpetual calendar.

== See also ==
- List of calendars
- World Season Calendar, proposed by Isaac Asimov in 1973, with similarities to the World Calendar
- International Fixed Calendar, a 13-month calendar reform proposed around the same time as the World Calendar
- Hanke–Henry Permanent Calendar, a leap-week perennial calendar proposal, which avoids the religious opposition to the World Calendar
- Bissextile day, the historic way of adding a leap day in the Julian calendar. Two days in succession were both numbered 24 February, a custom derived from ancient Rome that continued until the 16th century.
