= List of calendars =

Today (at UTC+00)
- Tuesday, 6 October 2026
Akan	Kwabene
Armenian	18 Sahmi 1476
Aztec	Izcalli 4, 10 Ōlīn
Babylonian	23 Ululu, 2337 SE
Balinese pawukon	Menga, Beteng, Jaya, Umanis, Was, Anggara of Wayang, Kala, Jangur, Dewa
Bengali	21 Ashshin, BS 1433
Chinese	Yin Water Ox・Turtle Beak Mansion; Fire Horse Year, Month 8, Day 26 (Qiufen, 2 days until Hanlu)
Common Era	6 October 2026 CE
Coptic	26 Thout, AM 1743
Egyptian	23 Mechir, 2775 NE
Ethiopian	26 Maskaram, 2019 Amätä Məhrät
French Republican	Décade II, Quartidi de Vendémiaire de l'Année 235 de la République
Gregorian	6 October, AD 2026
Hebrew	25 Tishrei, AM 5787
Hindu	Āśleṣā・Siddha; Solar: 20 Āśvina, 1948 SE; Lunisolar: Ekādaśī, Kṛishna pakṣa of Bhādrapada, 2083 VE; Rāudra・5127 KY・1,872,854
Icelandic	Þriðjudagur, 13 Haustmánuður 2026
Islamic	23 Rabi' al-thani, AH 1448 (using tabular method)
ISO week date	2026-W41-2
Japanese	26 Hazuki, Reiwa 8 (Shūbun, 2 days until Kanro)
Julian	23 September, AD 2026 (AM 7534)
Julian day	2461320
Korean	26 Dakdal, 4359 DE
Maya	13.0.13.17.17; 10 Yax, 10 Caban
Roman	ante diem IX Kalendas Octobres, MMDCCLXXIX AUC
Solar Hijri	14 Mehr, SH 1405
Tibetan	26 khrums, me pho rta 2153 or 1772 or 1000

This list of calendars records the various historical calendars used around the world at various times.

Historical calendars are often grouped into larger categories by cultural sphere or historical period; these are the Ancient Egyptian calendars, Babylonian calendars (Ancient Mesopotamia), Indian calendars (Hindu and Buddhist traditions of the Indian subcontinent), Chinese calendars and Mesoamerican calendars. In Classical Antiquity, the Hellenic calendars inspired the Roman calendar, including the Julian calendar introduced in 45 BC.

Calendars may also be categorised by their primary units (the astronomic bodies that define them): solar calendars are governed by the revolution of Earth around the Sun (making a solar year), lunar calendars are governed by revolution of the Moon around the Earth (making a lunar month) and lunisolar calendars are determined by an algorithmic combination of both. A day in all three types is determined by duration of the rotation of the Earth around its own axis.

A year in most solar calendars begins at or near a solstice or an equinox. Because a solar year lasts for a little less than 365 1/4 days, a solar calendar year lasts 365 days in common years and the fractional days are aggregated to have intermittent leap years of 366 days. This type of calendar has twelve months of 28 to 31 days. The best known solar calendar is the Gregorian calendar, introduced in 1582 as a refinement of the (solar) Julian calendar, is the de facto global civil calendar today.

A month in a lunar calendar begins either at the first crescent visible crescent of a new moon or at the moment of maximum full moon. A lunation (time between repeats of the same lunar phase) lasts a little over 29 1/2 days, so in this case a lunar month lasts 29 or 30 days. A lunar year consists of twelve lunar months, lasts about 354 days, and is independent of the solar cycle and thus migrates with respect to the seasons. The lunar new year's day is twelve lunar months after the preceding one. The best known lunar calendar is the Islamic calendar (or "Lunar Hijri calendar").

Months in a Lunisolar calendar also align with repeated phases of the moon but are designed so as not to drift too far away from the rhythm of the seasons. The accumulated 11-day differences are aggregated into a 13th or leap month, to bring it back into synchronicity with the solar cycle. The lunisolar new year's day is culturally determined. Various lunisolar calendars are used traditionally in Eastern, South-eastern and Southern Asia.

All of these calendars may also use weeks, which is a culturally determined number of days shorter than a month and possibly related to the length of moon phases.

== List of calendars ==
In the list below, specific calendars are given, listed by calendar type, time of introduction (if known), and the context of use and cultural or historical grouping (if applicable). Where appropriate, the regional or historical group is noted: Jewish, Muslim, Sikh, Mayan, Aztecan, Egyptian, Mesopotamian, Persian, Hindu, Buddhist, Pre-Columbian Mesoamerican, Hellenic, Julian or Gregorian-derived.

Calendars fall into four types: lunisolar, solar, lunar (as described above) and seasonal. The seasonal calendars rely on regular climatic changes in the environment (e.g., "wet season", "dry season") rather than direct lunar or solar observations. The Islamic and some Buddhist calendars are lunar, while most modern calendars are solilunar, based on either the Julian or the Gregorian calendars. The latter are often also known as solar since strictly solar calendars like the Egyptian have fallen out of use.

Some calendars listed are identical to the Gregorian calendar except for substituting regional month names or using a different calendar epoch. For example, the Thai solar calendar (introduced 1888) is the Gregorian calendar using a different epoch (543 BC) and different names for the Gregorian months (Thai names based on the signs of the zodiac).

Name	Type	Group	Introduction	Usage	Comments
Hebrew/Jewish Calendar	lunisolar	Canaan/Mesopotamian	Circa 3761 BC	Western World	It is based on lunar months with the intercalation of an additional month every 2 to 3 years to bring the cycle closer to the solar cycle. It is used to determine the dates for Jewish holidays and the appropriate public reading of Torah portions, yahrzeits (dates that commemorate the death of a relative), daily Psalm readings, and many other holidays, festivals and ceremonial uses.
Egyptian calendar	solar/fixed	Egyptian	Bronze Age	Middle Kingdom	The year is based on the heliacal rising of Sirius (Sothis) and divided into the three seasons of akhet (Inundation), peret (Growth) and shemu (Harvest). The heliacal rising of Sothis returned to the same point in the calendar every 1,460 years (a period called the Sothic cycle).
Umma calendar	lunisolar	Mesopotamian	Bronze Age	Sumer/Mesopotamia	Recorded in Neo-Sumerian records (21st century BC), presumably based on older (Ur III) sources.
Pentecontad calendar	solar	Mesopotamian	Bronze Age	Amorites	A Bronze Age calendar in which the year is divided into seven periods of fifty days, with an annual supplement of fifteen or sixteen days for synchronisation with the solar year.
Four Seasons and Eight Nodes	solar	Chinese	Bronze Age(?)	China	The year is divided into four seasons, and each season is divided into a festival and three months. The start and middle of each season is the key node of the year.
Gezer Calendar	solar/seasonal	Mesopotamian	1000 BC	Israel/Canaan	The years are divided into monthly or bi-monthly periods and attributes to each a duty such as harvest, planting, or tending specific crops.
Roman calendar	lunisolar	Roman	713 BC	Roman Republic	Based on the reforms introduced by Numa Pompilius in c. 713 BC.
Six Ancient Calendars	lunisolar	Chinese	Iron Age	China	Six classical (Zhou era) calendars: Huangdi, Zhuanxu, Xia, Yin, Zhou's calendar and Lu.
Nisg̱a'a	seasonal/lunisolar	Indigenous North America		Nisg̱a'a	The Nisga’a calendar revolves around harvesting of foods and goods used. The original year followed the various moons throughout the year.
Inuit calendar	seasonal	Indigenous North America		Inuit	The Inuit calendar is based on between six and eight seasons as solar and lunar timekeeping methods do not work in the polar regions.
Haab'	solar/fixed	Pre-Columbian (Maya)	1st millennium BC	Maya	
Tzolk'in	fixed (260 days)	Pre-Columbian (Maya)	1st millennium BC	Maya	
Xiuhpohualli	solar/fixed	Pre-Columbian (Aztec)		Aztecs	
Tonalpohualli	fixed (260 days)	Pre-Columbian (Aztec)		Aztecs	
Attic calendar	lunisolar (354/384 days)	Hellenic	6th century BC	Classical Athens	The year begins with the new moon after the summer solstice. It was introduced by the astronomer Meton in 432 BC. Reconstructed by Academy of Episteme.
Old Persian calendar	solar	Iranian	4th century BC(?)	Persian Empire	Based on earlier Babylonian/Mesopotamian models
Seleucid calendar	solilunar	Hellenic/Babylonian	4th century BC	Seleucid Empire	Combination of the Babylonian calendar, ancient Macedonian (Hellenic) month names and the Seleucid era.
Genesis Calendar	solilunar	Chinese	Han dynasty	China	Introduced the "month without mid-climate is intercalary" rule; based on a solar year of 365 385/1539 days and a lunar month of 29 43/81 days (19 years=235 months=6939 61/81 days).
Ptolemaic calendar	solar	Egyptian	238 BC	Ptolemaic Egypt	The Canopic reform introduced the leap year every fourth year, later adopted in the Julian calendar. The reform eventually went into effect with the introduction of the "Alexandrian calendar" by Augustus in 26/25 BC, which included a 6th epagomenal day for the first time in 22 BC.
Julian calendar	solilunar	Roman	45 BC	Western World	Revision of the Roman Republican calendar, in use in the Roman Empire and the Christian Middle Ages, and remains in use as liturgical calendar of Eastern Orthodox Churches.
Kurdish calendar	solar	Kurdish	Kurdistan	Iraqi Kurdistan	is a calendar used in the Iraqi Kurdistan region alongside the Islamic and Gregorian calendar. The First day in this month is called "Newroz" it means "New Day". The start of the calendar is marked by the Battle of Nineveh, a conquest of the Assyrians by the Medes and the Babylonians in 612 BC.
Coptic calendar	solilunar	Egyptian	1st century	Coptic Orthodox Church	Based on both the Ptolemaic calendar and the Julian calendar
Ge'ez calendar	solilunar	Ethiopian	1st century	Ethiopia, Ethiopian Christians, Eritrea, Eritrean Christians	the calendar associated with Ethiopian and Eritrean Churches, based on the Coptic calendar
Berber calendar	solar	Julian	In Roman times	North Africa	Julian calendar used for agricultural work.
Qumran calendrical texts	solar/fixed	—	c. 1st century	Second Temple Judaism	Description of a division of the year into 364 days, also mentioned in the pseudepigraphical Book of Enoch (the "Enoch calendar").
Coligny calendar	lunisolar	Gauls/Celts	Iron Age	Gauls/Celts	Early calendar used by Celtic peoples prior to the introduction of the Julian calendar, on a bronze plaque c. AD 200 but likely some centuries older.
Zoroastrian calendar	solar/fixed (365 days)	Iranian	3rd century	Sassanid Persia	Based on both the Old Persian and Seleucid (Hellenic) calendars. Introduced in AD 226, reformed in AD 272, and again several times in the 5th to 7th centuries.
Chinese Calendar, Dàmíng origin	lunisolar	Chinese	510	China	Created by Zu Chongzhi, most accurate calendar in the world at its invention
Korean calendar	lunisolar	Chinese-derived	6th century	Korea	Introduced from China, went through Korea to Japan.
Japanese calendar	lunisolar	Chinese-derived	6th century	Japan	Umbrella term for calendars historically and currently used in Japan, in the 6th century derived from the Chinese calendar.
Chinese Calendar, Wùyín origin	lunisolar	Chinese	619	China	First Chinese calendar to use the true moon motion
Islamic calendar (Lunar Hijri calendar)	lunar	Muslim	632	Islam	Hijri epoch combined with the observational lunar calendars used in Pre-Islamic Arabia. Remains in use for religious purposes in most of the Islamic world, with variations.
Pyu calendar	lunisolar	Hindu/Buddhist-derived	640	mainland Southeast Asia	Traditional calendar of Southeast Asia, in use until the 19th century. Traditionally said to originate in 640 (the calendar epoch) in Sri Ksetra Kingdom, one of the Burmese Pyu city-states.
Byzantine calendar	solilunar	Julian	988	Ecumenical Patriarchate of Constantinople	Julian calendar with Anno Mundi era in use c. 691 to 1728.
Armenian calendar	solar/fixed (365 days)	Iranian	medieval	medieval Armenia	Calendar used in medieval Armenia and as liturgical calendar of the Armenian Apostolic Church. Derived from the Zoroastrian (or related medieval Iranian calendars such as the Sogdian/Choresmian ones). It uses the epoch AD 552. In modern Armenian nationalism, an alternative epoch of 2492 BC is sometimes used.
Bulgar calendar	solar?	Bulgarian	Bronze Age	Volga Bulgaria	A reconstruction based on a short 15th-century transcript in Church Slavonic called Nominalia of the Bulgarian Khans, which contains 10 pairs of calendar terms.
Florentine calendar	solilunar	Julian	Medieval	Republic of Florence	Variant of the Julian calendar in use in medieval Florence
Pisan calendar	solilunar	Julian	Medieval	Republic of Pisa	Variant of the Julian calendar in use in medieval Pisa
Indian national calendar	solar	Gregorian-derived	Ancient (Officially adopted in 1957)	Republic of India	Gregorian calendar with months based in traditional Hindu calendars and numbering years based on the Saka era (AD 78).
Tamil calendar	solar	Hindu	Ancient	Tamil Nadu	The Hindu calendar used in Tamil Nadu
Malayalam calendar (Kollam Era)	solar/sidereal	Hindu	825	Kerala	According to Hermann Gundert, the Kollam era started as part of erecting a new Shiva Temple in Kollam and because of the strictly local and religious background, the other regions did not follow this system at first. Once Kollam port emerged as an important trade center, however, the other principalities also started following the new system of calendar. This theory backs the remarks of Ibn Battuta as well.
Vikram Samvat	solar	Hindu/ Buddhist	Medieval	India and Nepal	One of the Hindu calendars
Nepal Sambat	lunisolar	Hindu/Buddhist	9th century	Nepal	traditional to Nepal, official recognition in 2008
Bengali calendar	lunisolar	Bengali	Medieval	Bengal	Revised in 1987.
Thai lunar calendar	lunisolar	Hindu/Buddhist	Medieval	Thailand	A Buddhist calendar
Pawukon calendar	fixed (210 days)	Hindu		Bali	
Old Icelandic calendar	solar/week		10th century	medieval Iceland	Partly inspired by the Julian calendar and partly by older Germanic calendar traditions. Leap week calendar based on a year of 364 days.
Vietnamese calendar	lunisolar	Chinese-derived	10th century	Vietnam	After Vietnam regained independence following the third Chinese domination of Vietnam, the following dynasties established their own calendars based on Chinese prototypes, and every subsequent dynasty had appointed officers to man and create the calendar to be used in the realm.
Jalali calendar	solar	Iranian	1079	Seljuk Sultanate	A calendar reform commissioned by Sultan Jalal al-Din Malik Shah I
Hebrew calendar	lunisolar	Babylonian/Seleucid-derived	11th/12th century	Judaism	Recorded by Maimonides in the Mishneh Torah, resulting from various reforms and traditions developing since Late Antiquity. The Anno Mundi era gradually replaced the Seleucid era in Rabbinical literature in the 11th century.
Tibetan calendar	lunisolar	Buddhist/Chinese-derived	13th century	Tibet	The Kalacakra, a Buddhist calendar introduced in 13th-century Tibet
Seasonal Instruction	solar	Chinese	1281	China	Based on a solar year of 365.2425 (equal to the Gregorian year)
Runic calendar	solilunar	Julian	13th century	Sweden	A written representation of the Metonic cycle used in medieval and early modern Sweden, allowing to calculate the dates of the full moons relative to the Julian date. The introduction of the Gregorian calendar in Sweden in 1753 rendered the runic calendars unusable.
Igbo calendar	solilunar	Indigenous West African	13th Century	Igbo people	Proposal based in Igbo tradition dating back to 13th century, 13 lunar months of 28 days divided into seven 4-day periods, plus leap days.
Six Imperial Calendars	solar	Chinese	Ming dynasty	China	In use 1368-1644
Incan calendar	lunisolar	Pre-Columbian	15th century	Inca Empire	
Muisca calendar	solilunar	Pre-Columbian	15th century	Muisca	Complex lunisolar calendar with three different years, composed of months divided into thirty days.
Chula Sakarat	lunisolar	Burmese	16th century	Southeast Asia	
Gregorian calendar	solilunar	Julian-derived	1582	worldwide	Introduced as a retroactive leap-rule reform of the Julian calendar by the Roman Catholic church, since the 20th century in de facto use worldwide. Also contains and reforms the lunar Computus to determine the dates of Easter and other Christian holidays.
Javanese calendar	lunar	Islamic influenced	1633	Java	Based on the Hindu calendar using the Saka era (78 CE), but changed by Sultan Agung of Mataram its method of counting of years from solar years to lunar years as per the Islamic calendar.
Seasonal Constitution	solar	Chinese	1645	China	First Chinese Calendar to use the true motion of the sun.
Swedish calendar	solilunar	Julian-derived	1700	Sweden	Part of the controversy surrounding the adoption of the Gregorian calendar, in use 1700–1712.
Astronomical year numbering	solar	Julian-derived	1740	Astronomy	A mixture of Julian and Gregorian calendar, giving dates before 1582 in the Julian calendar, and dates after 1582 in the Gregorian calendar, counting 1 BC as year zero, and negative year numbers for 2 BC and earlier.
French Republican Calendar	solar	Gregorian	1793	First French Republic	In use in revolutionary France 1793 to 1805.
Pancronometer	solilunar	Gregorian	1745	—	Universal Georgian Calendar proposed by Hugh Jones
Rumi calendar	solilunar	Julian	1839	Ottoman Empire	Julian calendar using the Hijri era introduced in the Ottoman Empire.
Positivist calendar	solar/fixed	Gregorian	1849	—	Solar calendar with 13 months of 28 days.
Badí‘ calendar	solar	Baháʼí	1873	Baháʼí	Uses a year of 19 months of 19 days each and a 1844 era. Also known as the "Baháʼí Calendar" or the "Wondrous Calendar".
Thai solar calendar	solilunar	Gregorian	1888	Thailand	The Gregorian calendar but using the Buddhist Era (543 BC)
Invariable Calendar	solar/fixed	Gregorian	1900	—	Gregorian calendar with four 91-day quarters of 13 weeks
International Fixed Calendar	solar/fixed	Gregorian	1902	—	A "perpetual calendar" with a year of 13 months of 28 days each.
Minguo calendar	solilunar	Gregorian	1912	Republic of China	Months and days use the Gregorian calendar, introduced in China in 1912.
Revised Julian calendar	solilunar	Julian-derived	1923	some Orthodox churches	currently synchronized with the Gregorian calendar, but different leap rule and cycle (900 years), also called Meletian calendar or Milanković calendar, after Milutin Milanković who developed it.
Solar Hijri calendar	solar	Iranian/Islamic	1925	Iran, Afghanistan	New Year is the day of the astronomical vernal equinox. The calendar as introduced in 1925 revived Iranian month names but counted the years of the Hijri era. The era was changed in 1976 to 559 BC (reign of Cyrus the Great), but was reverted to the Hijri era after the Iranian Revolution.
Era Fascista	solilunar	Gregorian	1926	Italy	Epoch is 29 October 1922; in use from 1926–1943
Soviet calendar	solar/fixed	Gregorian	1929	Soviet Union	Gregorian calendar with 5- and 6-day weeks, used during 1929 to 1940.
World Calendar	solar/fixed	Gregorian	1930	—	Perpetual calendar with 1–2 off-week days, preferred and almost adopted by the United Nations in 1950s
Pax Calendar	solar/week	Gregorian	1930	—	Leap week calendar
Pataphysical calendar	solilunar	Gregorian	1949	—	Absurdist variant of the Gregorian calendar by Alfred Jarry.
Assyrian calendar	solar	Babylonian	1950s	Assyrianism	Solar calendar with an "Assyrian era" of 4750 BC, introduced in Assyrian nationalism in the 1950s
Discordian calendar	solar	Gregorian	1963	Discordianism	Calendar invented in the context of the absurdist or parody religion of Discordianism, Gregorian calendar variant with a year consisting of five 73-day seasons.
World Season Calendar	solar	Gregorian	1973	—	Divides the year into four seasons.
Dreamspell	solar/week	Mayan	1990	esotericism	13 months of 28 days each, synchronized with the Maya 260-day Tzolkin, calibrated to the Chilam Balam timing systems
Holocene calendar	solilunar	Gregorian	1993	—	The Gregorian calendar with the era shifted by 10,000 years.
Juche era calendar	solilunar	Gregorian	1997	North Korea	Gregorian calendar with the era 1912 (birth of Kim Il-sung)
Nanakshahi calendar	solar	Sikh	1789	Sikhism religion, Punjab	Sikh Calendar numbering years based on the era 1469 (birth of Guru Nanak)
Symmetry454	solar/week	Gregorian	2004	—	Leap week calendar with 4:5:4 weeks per month
Hanke–Henry Permanent Calendar	solar/week	Gregorian	2004	—	Leap week calendar with 30:30:31 days per month, revised in 2011 and 2016
Vira Nirvana Samvat	lunisolar	Hindu	Ancient India	India/Nepal	The Vira Nirvana Samvat (era) is a calendar era beginning on 7 October 527 BCE. It commemorates the Nirvana of Lord Mahaviraswami, the 24th Jain Tirthankara. This is one of the oldest system of chronological reckoning which is still used in India.
Mizo calendar	lunisolar	Mizo	unknown / Lushai Chiefdoms	Mizo people	12 month calendar historically used to track the cycle of jhum cultivation and festivals.

== Variant month names ==
Regional or historical names for lunations or Julian/Gregorian months

Tradition	culture	comments
Germanic calendar	Germanic	Medieval records of Germanic names of lunar months later equated with the Julian months.
Berber calendar	Berber	reconstructed medieval Berber-language names of the Julian months used in pre-Islamic (Roman era) North Africa
Lithuanian calendar	Lithuania	Lithuanian names for the Gregorian months and days of the week, officially recognized in 1918.
Rapa Nui calendar	Easter Islands	Thirteen names of lunar months recorded in the 19th century.
Xhosa calendar	Xhosa people	
Turkmen	Turkmenistan	Turkmen names officially adopted in 2002 following Ruhnama by president-for-life Saparmurat Niyazov.
Hellenic calendars	Hellenistic Greece	A great variety of regional month names in Ancient Greece, mostly attested in the 2nd century BC.
Slavic calendar	Slavic	Local month names in various Slavic countries, based on weather patterns and conditions, and agricultural activities that take place in each respective month.
Romanian calendar	Romania and Moldova	Traditional names for the twelve months of the Gregorian calendar, which are usually used by the Romanian Orthodox Church.
Thai calendar	Thailand	Names of 12 zodiacs, borrowed from Sanskrit zodiacs. The endings indicates the length of the months.

== Non-standard weeks ==
Tradition	Week Length	Comments
Bali	Various	The Balinese calendar has ten types of weeks (wewaran): Ékawara the one-day week, Dwiwara the two-day week, Triwara the three-day week, all the way until Dasawara the ten-day week.
Igbo	4 days	The traditional Igbo week consists of four market days: eke, orie, afor, and nkwo.
Yoruba	4 days	Traditional Yoruba calendar
Korea	5 days	For traditional markets in Korea, for example, the market is open every five days.
Java	5 days	Pasaran, used to determine the opening of markets in Javanese-speaking areas. The days are: Legi, Pahing, Pon, Wagé, and Kliwon. Combined with the regular 7-day week, they make up a 35-day cycle for wetonan, the Javanese astrology used to determine marriage compatibility, luck, personality, etc.
Discordian	5 days	
Akan	6 days	A traditional "six-day week" which combined with the Gregorian seven-day week gave rise to a 42-day cycle.
Ancient Rome	8 days	The Roman nundinal cycle.
Burmese	8 days	
Celtic	8 days	reconstructed.
Baltic	9 days	Linguistic reconstruction; the Gediminas Sceptre indicated that a week lasted for nine days during King Gediminas' reign.
Chinese	10 days	
Egyptian Calendar	10 days	The 10-day period was known as decans or decades
French Republican Calendar	10 days	
Aztecs	13 days	Trecena, division of the Tonalpohualli 260-day period

== Calendaring and timekeeping standards ==
- Coordinated Universal Time, adopted 1960 and since 1972 including a system of observation-based leap seconds.
- ISO 8601, standard based on the Gregorian calendar, Coordinated Universal Time and ISO week date, a leap week calendar system used with the Gregorian calendar
- Fiscal year varies with different countries. Used in accounting only.
- 360-day calendar used for accounting
- 365-day calendar used for accounting
- Unix time, number of non-leap seconds elapsed since 1 January 1970, 00:00:00 (UTC).
- Julian day, number of days elapsed since 1 January 4713 BC, 12:00:00 (UTC).
- Heliocentric Julian Date, Julian day corrected for differences in the Earth's position with respect to the Sun.
- Barycentric Julian Date, Julian day corrected for differences in the Earth's position with respect to the barycentre of the Solar System.
- Lilian date, number of days elapsed since the beginning of the Gregorian Calendar on 15 October 1582.
- Rata Die, number of days elapsed since 1 January 1 AD 1 in the proleptic Gregorian calendar.

== Non-Earth or fictional ==
- Darian calendar (proposed for Mars, not used in planetary science)
- Discworld calendar (fictional)
- Middle-earth calendars (fictional)
- Stardates (from Star Trek, fictional)

== See also ==
- Advent calendar – Special calendar used to count the days of Advent in anticipation of Christmas
- Calendar of saints – Christian liturgical calendar celebrating saints
- Cosmic Calendar – Method to visualize the chronology of the universe
- Epoch – Reference point from which time is measured
- Geologic Calendar – Analogy to communicate geologic time
- History of calendars
- Horology – Art or science of measuring time
- List of adoption dates of the Gregorian calendar by country
- Liturgical year – Annually recurring fixed sequence of Christian feast days
- Perpetual calendar – Calendar designed to look up the day of the week for a given date
- Wall calendar – Stationery to track dates
- World calendar – Proposed reform of Gregorian calendar

== Sources ==
- Elis, Hadi (2004). "The Kurdish demand for statehood and the future of Iraq". The Journal of Social, Political, and Economic Studies. 29 (2): 145–166.
- Gunter, Michael M. (2009). The A to Z of the Kurds. Scarecrow Press. ISBN 9780810863347.
- Hirschler, K. (2001). "Defining the Nation: Kurdish Historiography in Turkey in the 1990s" (PDF). Middle Eastern Studies. 37 (3). Informa UK Limited: 145–166. doi:10.1080/714004406. ISSN 0026-3206. S2CID 59445286.
- Kirmanj, Sherko (2014-07-15). "Kurdish History Textbooks: Building a Nation-State within a Nation-State". The Middle East Journal. 68 (3): 367–384. doi:10.3751/68.3.12. ISSN 0026-3141. S2CID 144636394.
