= Enoch calendar =

Solar calendar described in the Book of Enoch

The Enoch calendar (or Enochian calendar) is an ancient calendar described in the pseudepigraphal First Book of Enoch. It divided the year into four seasons of exactly 13 weeks. Each season consisted of two 30-day months followed by one 31-day month, with the 31st day ending the season, so that Enoch's year described from a perspective of the heavens consisted of exactly 364 days.

The Enoch calendar was purportedly given to Enoch by the angel Uriel. Four named days, inserted as the 31st day of every third month, were named instead of numbered, which "placed them outside the numbering". The First Book of Enoch gives the count of 2,912 days for 8 years, which divides out to exactly 364 days per year based on Enoch's observantions in the heavens. This specifically excludes any periodic intercalations. However when Enoch's observation point was different he states there are "three hundred and sixty-five and a quarter" days per year. In First Enoch Chapter 71 Verse 42 it is written that the last day of the calendar year is Spring equilux (equal time periods of light and dark). In this manner Enoch's calendar is based on the same fixed point in time determined by the Great Luminary, the sun.

== Evaluation ==
Calendar expert John Pratt wrote that

"The Enoch calendar has been criticized as hopelessly primitive because, with only 364 days, it would get out of sync with the seasons so quickly: In only 25 years the seasons would arrive an entire month early. Such a gross discrepancy, however, merely indicates that the method of intercalation has been omitted."

Pratt pointed out that by adding an extra week at the end of every seventh year (or Sabbatical year), and then adding an additional extra week to every fourth Sabbatical year (or every 28 years), the calendar could be as accurate as the Julian calendar:

$$\left( \frac{\ 52\ \mathsf{weeks}\ }{\ 1\ \mathsf{year}\ } + \frac{\ 1\ \mathsf{week}\ }{\ 7\ \mathsf{years}\ } + \frac{\ 1\ \mathsf{week}\ }{\ 28\ \mathsf{years}\ } \right)\ \times\ \frac{\ 7\ \mathsf{days}\ }{\ 1\ \mathsf{week}\ }$$

$$= \left(\ 52 + \frac{\ 5\ }{ 28 }\ \right)\ \frac{\ \mathsf{week}\ }{ \text{year} }\ \times\ \frac{\ 7\ \mathsf{days}\ }{\ 1\ \mathsf{week}\ }
= \frac{\ \left( 365 + \tfrac{\ 1\ }{ 4 } \right) \mathsf{days}\ }{\ 1\ \mathsf{year}\ }$$

$= \frac{\ 365\ \mathsf{days}\ }{\ 1\ \mathsf{year}\ } + \frac{\ 1\ \mathsf{day}\ }{\ 4\ \mathsf{years}\ } ~.$

However, Pratt also added that there is a way to use a pattern of intercalation that would make the Enoch calendar more accurate than the Gregorian and Mayan calendars:

The final long-term correction is that in every set of five Great Years [a Great Year is defined as a 364-year cycle], two of the extra weeks ending the 28-year cycle would be skipped, one in the third and another in the fifth Great Year. In those two years there would be only one extra week of years rather than two. That correction results in an average year length of 365.2423 days, which better approximates the current year length of 365.2422 days than does the Gregorian year of 365.2425 days.

Pratt thus awarded the calendar of Enoch 5 stars, using his objective rating system that uses the following criteria: 1) predictability (which allows for easy scheduling of future events); 2) long-term accuracy (in relation to the celestial bodies the calendar is tracking); 3) simplicity (of which short-term accuracy; common understandability; easily remembered patterned repetitions; and ease of use are key); 4)degree of alignment with an uninterrupted day count; and 5) nested patterns called "wheels within wheels". By comparison, the Gregorian calendar earned 3.5 stars using Pratt's rating system.

P. J. Oh has calculated the total amount of solar drift that would occur over the quintet of Great Years is 0.196 days’ worth of solar misalignment if Pratt's proposed intercalation pattern is used, assuming that NASA's measurement of the average length of the solar year, 365.2422 days, is highly accurate.

P. J. Oh has also devised an alternate pattern of intercalation, which consists of delaying the start of the new year by 7 days (inclusively reckoned in accordance with Hebraic convention) after every 5th year, and adding a full day every 10th Jubilee cycle, for instance, before every 500th year. This intercalation pattern is based on the fact that the 74th chapter of the Book of Enoch observes that the point where 5 years’ worth of months (i.e. 1800 days) elapses in addition to 6 days for each of those past five years, equaling 30 days - thereby totaling 1830 days – this is the point when the moon is exactly a month (i.e. 30 days) behind the sun. If we divide 1830 by the number of solar days in a lunar month: 1830 / 29.5305956 = 61.969627189 in number of lunar cycles. (By comparison, there are exactly 61 thirty-day month cycles within a 1830 day period.)

Thus, it appears 1830-day period would be relevant to the 1820-day total length corresponding to 5 Enoch calendar years, if we supposed that the instruction to blow the shofar after the Day of Atonement was a redaction intended to preserve the original beginning of the year in deference to the "purists" such as the Essenes also later were; and that this instruction could then be interpreted as a sort of vestigial evidence that the 7th day after the end of the previous cycle of 5 years was the original beginning of the sixth year following the previous quintet of Enoch calendar years. Adding 7 days (inclusively reckoned) every 5th year would of course solve the problem of having roughly 1.2422 days less than the solar year during every 364-day year, because:

(5 * 364) + 9 = 1829

Thus we can understand the 1830th day as a sort of sabbath day in which reconciliation for solar drift is performed, just as sin also is reconciled on the Day of Atonement.

Thus, P. J. Oh's proposed intercalation pattern appears to be a way to harmonize the law appearing in Numbers 29:1, which requires blowing of the shofar after the Day of Atonement, with the astronomical observations in the 74th chapter of the Book of Enoch.

== Comparison to other ancient calendars ==
The group whose writings were found at Qumran also used a 364-day calendar that was similar to that of Enoch (see Qumran calendrical texts). But their calendar was even more similar to that of the Book of Jubilees.

In Chapters 80-82 of the Book of Enoch, there are four special days; they are the four ‘leaders of the stars’ that preside over the four equal seasons of the year. The context here is further related to the agricultural seasons, and when different crops mature. In Chapter 82, the names of these leaders are given as Milkiel, Helememelek, Meleeyel and Narel, and each of them serves for 91 days.

Formally, these four days are actually not counted as ‘days’ in the Book of Enoch, but they are more like the ‘leaders’ of the three 30-day months that follow them. According to Stern, these four days are generally believed to relate to solstices and equinoxes, or "the four cardinal points or tropes of the solar year", which will add to make four 31-day months within one year. These days are also referred to as the "leaders of the year" and of its four seasons.

These four special days are also present in the book of Jubilees, and they are referred to as the “days of remembrance”, or “memorial days”.

== Book of Jubilees calendar ==
The Book of Jubilees, also found at Qumran, shares many parallels with Enoch. The Enoch calendar and the Book of Jubilees are connected through their shared use of a schematic 364-day calendar, as well as a similar understanding of the division of the year into four seasons. Each year has 364 days, divided into 12 months of 30 and 31 days each.

Nevertheless, there are also differences, such as that the Jubilees focuses heavily on Sabbath-observance in the context of its calendar, whereas the Book of Enoch doesn’t even mention this topic, perhaps because the main focus of Enoch is primarily astronomical, without any special regard to Biblical events and festivals. The Jubilees' 364‐day calendar, in contrast, focuses especially on those.

The four special days are also present in the Book of Jubilees, but these four 'days of remembrance' are now being placed at the beginning of the 31-day months, rather than at the end. They are placed as the first day of the first, fourth, seventh, and tenth months. As opposed to the Enoch version, they are now fully integrated into the calendar, and "are not explicitly identified as additional". They are also referred to as the "days of appointed times" in Jubilees.

It is believed that the Jubilees is a later work because it depends on Enoch in many of its passages. For example, since 2008, there has been a consensus that the Animal Apocalypse in 1 Enoch came first and Jubilees came later.

== See also ==
- Pentecontad calendar
- Hebrew calendar
