= Rongorongo text S =

One of the undeciphered texts of Easter Island

Text S of the rongorongo corpus, the larger of two tablets in Washington, D.C. and therefore also known as the Great or Large Washington tablet, is one of two dozen surviving rongorongo texts.

== Other names ==
S is the standard designation, from Barthel (1958). Fischer (1997) refers to it as RR16.

== Location ==
Department of Anthropology, National Museum of Natural History, Smithsonian Institution, Washington. Catalog # A129774.

There is a reproduction in the Musée de l'Homme, Paris.

== Physical description ==
S is a long bevelled but not fluted driftwood board of Podocarpus latifolius wood (Orliac 2007), 63 × 12 × 1.6 cm, that curves to a point at one end. It was cut into a plank for a canoe (Fischer believes line Sb1 was planed for this purpose), and twelve holes were bored along the perimeter for lashings. Both sides were heavily damaged by fire for "a great loss of text".

== Provenance ==
In December 1886, Thomson bought both Washington tablets on Easter Island with the mediation of his Tahitian aide Alexander Salmon "after a great deal of trouble and at considerable expense". He gave both to the Smithsonian in April 1890.

Fischer (1997) states that this and Mamari are "the only authentic rongorongo artefacts whose premissionary owners are known by name." Thomson was told that "The large one [S] is a piece of drift-wood, that from its peculiar shape is supposed to have been used as a portion of a canoe". Thirty years later, Routledge was told the same:

The natives told us that an expert living on the south coast, whose house had been full of such glyphs, abandoned them at the call of the missionaries, on which a man named Niari, being of a practical mind, got hold of the discarded tablets and made a boat of them wherein he caught much fish. When the "sewing came out," he stowed the wood into a cave at an ahu near Hanga Roa, to be made later into a new vessel there. Pakarati, an islander now living, found a piece, and it was acquired by the U.S.A. ship Mohican. (Routledge, 1919:207)

Fischer (1997) reports that in her field notes, Routledge documented that the tablets had belonged to Puhi ꞌa Rona, a tuhunga tâ (scribe) of Hanga Hahave, whose house "was full of tablets and [he] scindered them at the call of the missionaries". (This may explain the fire damage.) It was Nicolás Pakarati who sold it to Thomson.

Although the missionaries have been blamed for the burning of the tablets, in the manner of the Mayan codices, there is no hint of this in their own writings, and the few missionaries who were active on Easter Island at the time either ignored the tablets (Eyraud) or attempted to collect them (Roussel). If tablets were burned after conversion to Christianity, it may have been part of a more general pattern of abandoning the old religion.

The Smithsonian catalog states,

Catalog Number A129774-0
Collector(s) Maj. William Judah Thomson
Collection Date 18 Dec - 31 Dec 1886
Accession Number 023098
Donor Name Thomson, William Judah
Accession Date 1890-Apr-19
INSCRIBED WOODEN TABLET OBTAINED BY W. J. THOMSON, PAYMASTER OF THE U.S. NAVY SHIP 'MOHICAN' IN EASTER ISLAND, DECEMBER 1886. TABLET WAS PURCHASED FROM MR. A. A. SALMON [a.k.a. Tati Salmon], A EUROPEAN SETTLER AND LONG-TIME RESIDENT OF EASTER ISLAND. THOMSON STATES TABLET "IS A PIECE OF DRIFTWOOD THAT FROM ITS PECULIAR SHAPE IS SUPPOSED TO HAVE BEEN USED AS A PORTION OF A CANOE" (USNM ANNUAL REPORT 1889:514) TRANSFERRED FROM ETHNOLOGY TO ARCHEOLOGY ON MAY 2, 1933. FORMERLY ON EXHIBIT NMNH HALL 8, UNIT 4. THREE PLASTER CASTS [A129774-1] MADE OF BOTH REVERSE AND OBVERSE SIDES.
This rongorongo tablet or board is illus. Fig. 49, p. 76, in "Splendid Isolation: Art of Easter Island" by Eric Kjellgren, Metropolitan Museum of Art/Yale University Press, 2001, and identified there as an inscribed tablet (kohau rongorongo). It is known as the Great or Large Washington tablet.
From card for 129773-4: "Engraved with shark's tooth. Transferred to Div. Archeology May 2, 1933."
From second card formerly in Ethnology card file: "See USNM - AR 1889 Plate 40-41 [after p. 524]. Translation on p. 523; note on p. 537. Description of acquisition on p. 514. Cast made and sent to Musee d' Ethnographic, May, 1933."

== Content ==
Fischer (1997) identifies a list of short sequences, each beginning with the glyph 380.1, as a pattern shared between the Large Washington (lines 3-4 and 6 on side a) and several other tablets.

== Text ==
There are eight lines of glyphs on side a and nine on side b, with ~ 730 recognizable glyphs out of an original 1,200 or so. The edges of the plank are inscribed.

Barthel

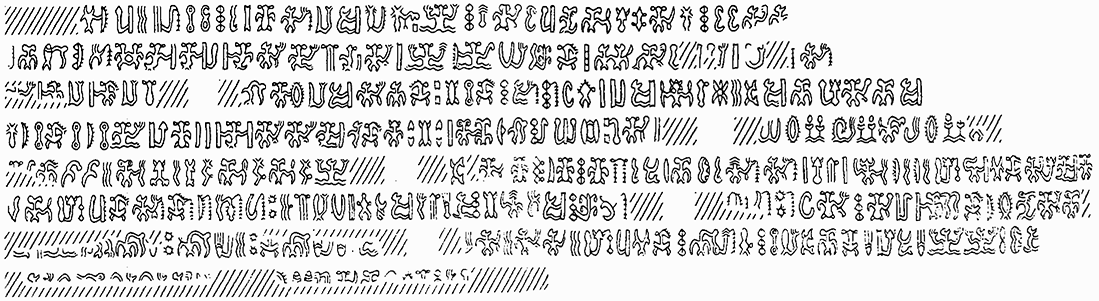
Side a, as traced by Barthel. The lines have been rearranged to reflect English reading order: Sa1 at top, Sa8 at bottom.
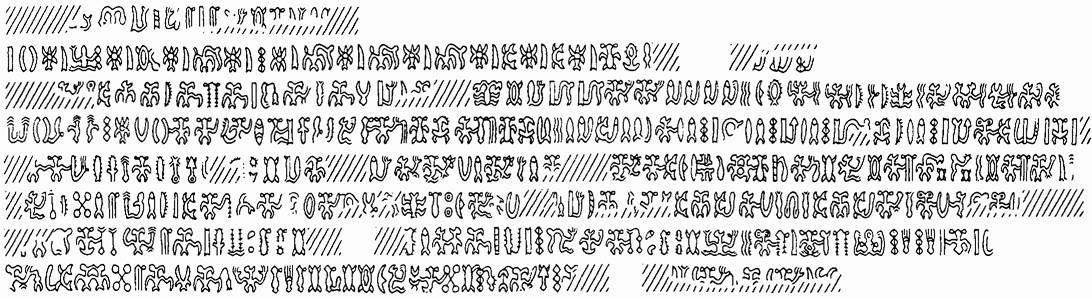
Side b, as traced by Barthel: Sb1 at top, Sb9 at bottom.

Fischer

== Image gallery ==
Color photo of side a

Color photo of side b

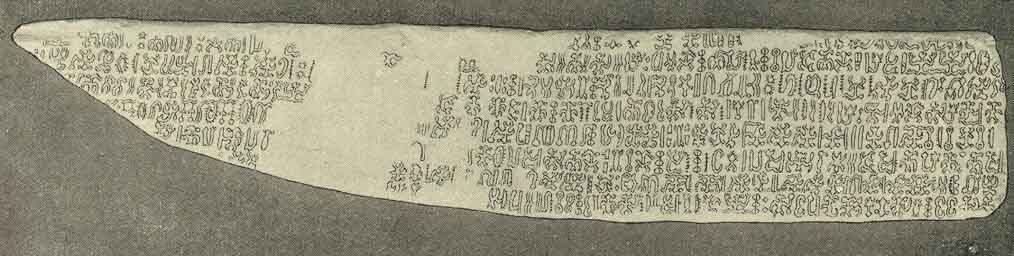
Engraving of side a

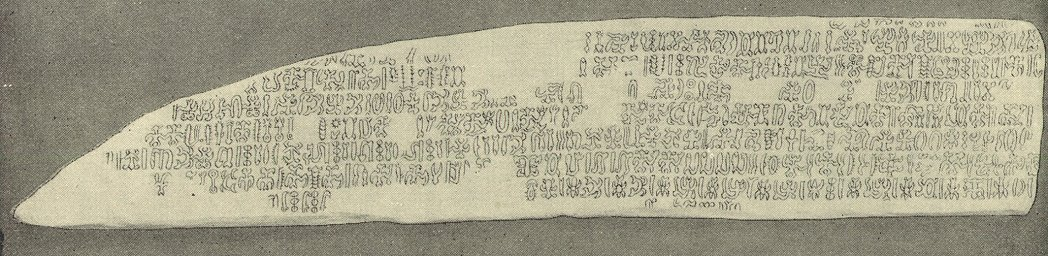
Engraving of side b

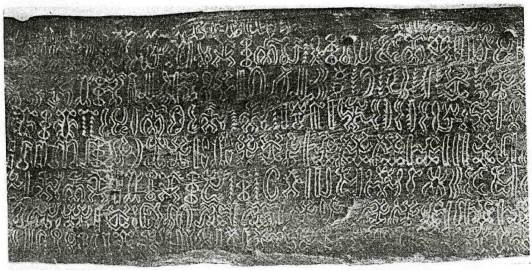
Rubbing of part of side a
