= Qumran disc =

The Qumran disc is a small limestone sundial discovered at the settlement of Qumran, where the Dead Sea Scrolls were also found. The disc was discovered in 1954 in the excavations of Roland de Vaux, but it was not identified as sundial until the late 1990s. The historical context of the disc is during the Period lb or II of Qumran (ca. 103 BCE-68 CE). The disc is about 14.5 cm (6 in) in diameter.

The disk has a flat basin shape with a low rim, and it has a round hole in its center, which is believed to be the socket to hold a gnomon, or short upright stick. The disc also has four concentric circular channels incised on its face.

Also there are many radial lines marked on the disc. Their interpretation is not entirely clear, and scholars offered various theories about them. Some scholars also dispute that the disc is a sundial.

The discovery of the sundial may be significant because it provides material evidence of Qumran community's interest in measuring time. It has been known before, based on the contents of some of the Dead Sea Scrolls, that the Qumran people had interest in calendars and time-keeping methods.

The original is on display at the Israel Museum's Shrine of the Book, and an enlarged replica has been installed at the Qumran site.

== Egyptian sundials ==
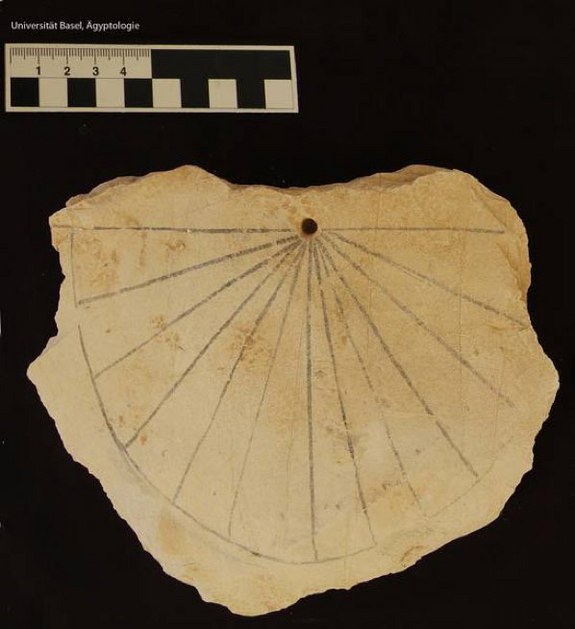
Ancient Egyptian sundial

Dirk Couprie has compared the Qumran disc to the Egyptian mrhyt (or mrht) devices. These consist of a flat horizontal limestone piece, at one end of which there's an upright small block serving as a gnomon. These pieces are usually described as sundials.

The nature of these sundials, and how they may have functioned, has been examined by L. Vodolazhskaya. According to the author, they probably provided a fairly accurate time measurement.

== See also ==
- Qumran calendrical texts
- History of sundials

== Bibliography ==
- M. Albani and U. Glessmer, "An Astronomical Measuring Instrument from Qumran," The Provo International Conference on the Dead Sea Scrolls: Technological Innovations, New Texts, and Reformulated Issues (eds D.W. Parry and E. Ulrich; STDJ 30; Leiden: Brill, 1999)
- GEORGE M. HOLLENBACK 2000, THE QUMRAN ROUNDEL: AN EQUATORIAL SUNDIAL? Dead Sea Discoveries, 2000, Vol. 7, No. 2 (2000), pp. 123–129
- Hollenback, G. (2004). More on the Qumran Roundel as an Equatorial Sundial. Dead Sea Discoveries, 11(3), 289–292.
- Couprie, D. (2013). The Qumran Roundel and the mrḫyt: A Comparative Approach. Dead Sea Discoveries, 20(2), 264–306.
- Helen R. Jacobus 2015, Zodiac Calendars in the Dead Sea Scrolls and Their Reception. Ancient Astronomy and Astrology in Early Judaism. Brill. p. 386ff
- SARAH SYMONS 1999, ANCIENT EGYPTIAN ASTRONOMY: TIMEKEEPING and COSMOGRAPHY in the NEW KINGDOM. PhD Thesis, University of Leicester—archive.org
