= Rongorongo text C =

Inscription containing the Rapa Nui calendar

Text C of the rongorongo corpus, also known as Mamari, is one of two dozen surviving rongorongo (/ˈrɒŋɡoʊˈrɒŋɡoʊ/; Rapa Nui: [ˈɾoŋoˈɾoŋo]) texts. It contains the Rapa Nui calendar. It is the only example of the Rongorongo script agreed to have been at least partially deciphered with regard to its meaning, while the understanding is still partial.

== Background ==
Rongorongo is a system of glyphs discovered in the 19th century on Easter Island that appears to be writing or proto-writing. It is assumed to be related to the Rapa Nui language, possibly being its writing system.

== Other names ==
'C' is the standard designation, from Barthel (1958). Fischer (1997) refers to the text as RR2.

Jaussen called it Miro-Mimosa ('Mimosa wood').

== Location ==
Text C is held in the general archives of the Padri dei Sacri Cuori (SSCC), Casa Generalizia, Via Rivarone 85, I-00166 Rome, Italy.

Reproductions are located at the SSCC; Musée de l'Homme, Paris; Museum of Mankind, London; Cinquantenaire, Brussels; Museum für Völkerkunde, Berlin (2 copies); Institut für Völkerkunde, Tübingen (prior to 1989; on loan from the Linden-Museum); and the van Hoorebeeck Collection, Belgium.

== Physical description ==
The tablet is rounded, rectangular and unfluted, measuring 29 cm × 19.5 cm × 2.5 cm (11.42 in × 7.68 in × 0.98 in), made of Pacific rosewood (Orliac 2005). The tablet is in excellent condition, with one hole at the top (verso). Fischer describes it as one of the loveliest tablets, and it may be the oldest of the extant rongorongo tablets.

== Provenance ==
One of Florentin-Étienne Jaussen's tablets, Mamari was apparently collected on Easter Island by Father Gaspar Zumbohm in 1870 and sent to him in Tahiti. It was sent to the headquarters of the Congrégation des Sacrés-Coeurs et de l'Adoration (SSCC) in Paris, where it was deposited in the Missionary Museum, either by Jaussen in 1888 or by the French navy in 1892 after his death. In 1905 it was moved to the SSCC museum in Braine-le-Comte, Belgium. In 1953 it followed the SSCC to Grottaferrata, near Rome, and in 1964 to Rome itself. In 1974 the SSCC moved to its permanent headquarters in Rome.

Fischer (1997) believes that Mamari and the Large Washington tablet (S) are the only tablets with a documented premissionary provenance. He identifies it with a tablet called Kouhau ꞌo te Ranga that had belonged to the ꞌariki Ngaꞌara, was stolen by his servant, who gave it to a friend, whose son sold it to Zumbohm.

Orliac (2005) calculated that in order for the trunk of the Portia tree the wood was cut from to be 20 cm (7.9 in) in diameter, the tree must have been some 15 m (49 ft) tall. Easter Island had long been deforested of trees that size: Roggeveen, in 1722, described the island as "destitute of large trees"; González in 1770 wrote, "Not a single tree is to be found capable of furnishing a plank so much as 15 cm in width"; Forster in 1774 reported that there was not a tree upon the island which exceeded the height of 10 ft (3.0 m) (Flenley and Bahn 1992:172).

== Contents ==
Mamari is the only rongorongo text whose function has been ascertained. Two and a half of the fourteen lines on the recto have been shown to include calendrical information; Guy suggests possible phonetic readings of some of the glyphs in this section. Additional lines on both sides may also be calendrical.

Katherine Routledge was told that the Kouhau ‘o te Ranga tablet was one of a kind, a ranga tablet listing the names of enemy prisoners, and had the power to "give conquest in war" and enslave the conquered. However, the contents of Mamari are varied, with several passages paralleling inscriptions on other tablets, such as a repeated 380.1 glyph in lines Cv2-4, as well as the calendar.

Jaussen's informant Metoro Tau‘a Ure started his 'reading' of the tablet at the bottom of the verso, contradicting Pozdniakov's determination of the order. In addition, instead of continuing on the recto at the point where the verso left off, he restarted at the point diagonally opposite with a new subject.

== Text ==
Fourteen lines of glyphs on each side, with ~ 1000 glyphs in total. A sequence of glyphs shared with tablets E, G, K, and N starts on Barthel's line Ca14 and continues onto Cb1, leading Pozdniakov to conclude that the sides Barthel listed as a and b are recto and verso, respectively.

A distorted composite glyph has been squeezed in on the edge of the tablet, at the beginning of line Cr7, within the text of the calendar. This glyph is missing from Barthel's transcription and does not appear in any photograph. Fischer (1997) suggests it may be 631.78, but the repetition of the sequence in which it is found indicates it is an abbreviation of 670-8.78.711.

Barthel

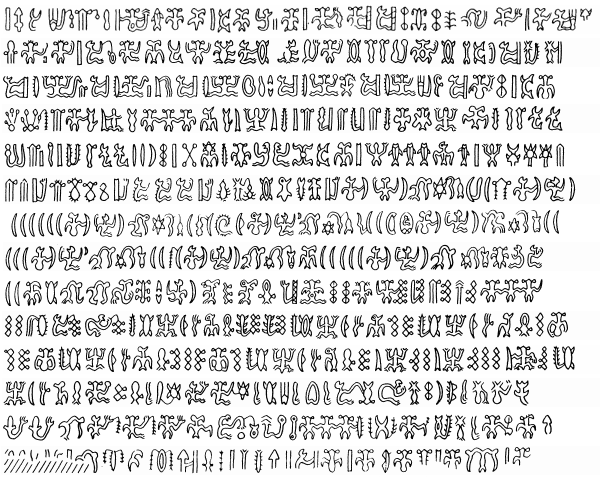
Recto (side a), as traced by Barthel. The lines have been rearranged to reflect English reading order: Cr1 at top, Cr14 at bottom.

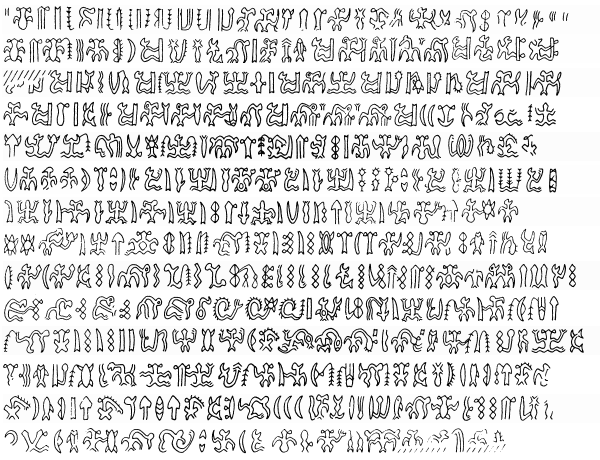
Verso (side b), as traced by Barthel: Cv1 at top, Cv14 at bottom.

Fischer

== Image gallery ==
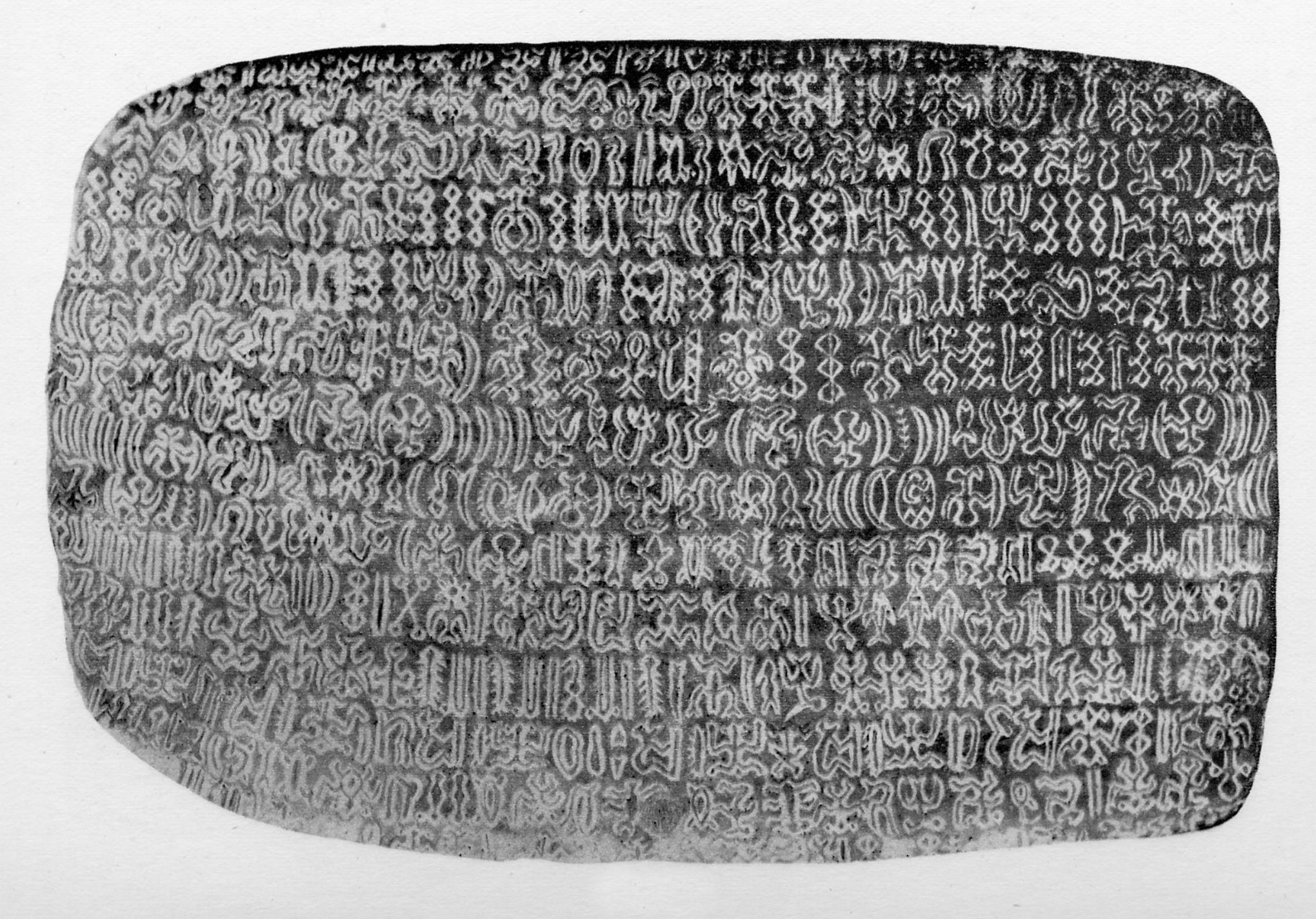
Recto

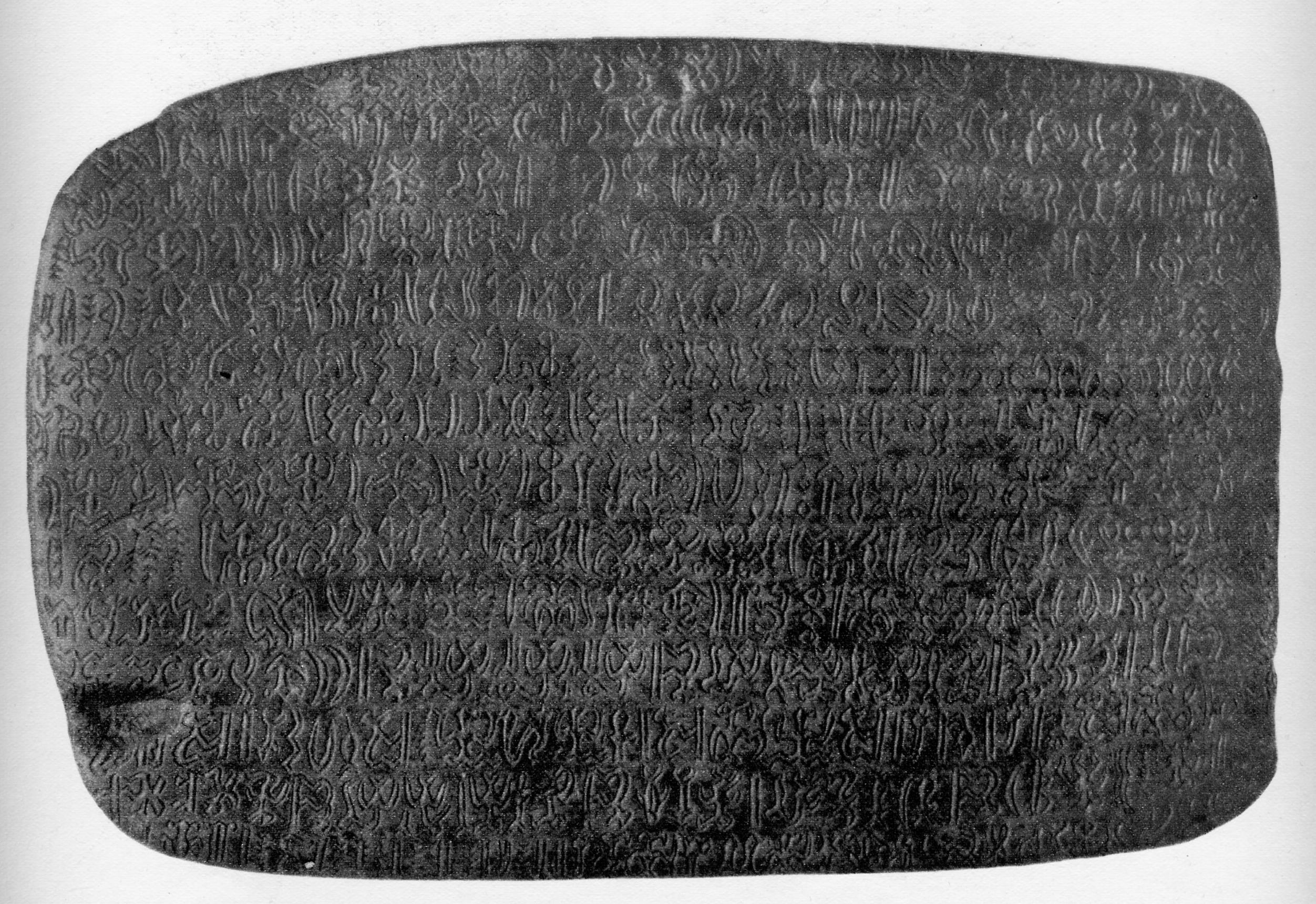
Verso

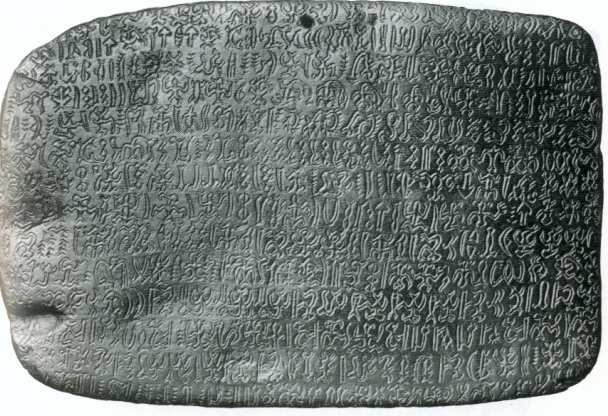
Verso

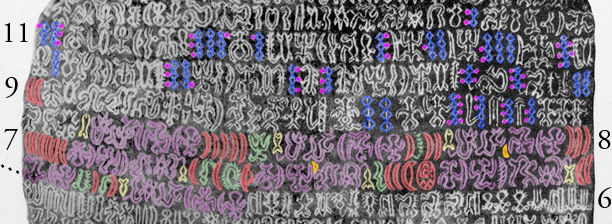
The calendrical sequence. Red are the 28+2 nights of the month, full moon in the center; purple are a sequence repeated eight times; the fish (yellow) are head up during the waxing moon and head down during the waning moon; green are glyphs proposed by Guy to be phonetic complements.
