= Thursday of the Dead =

Feast day in the Levant

- Observed by: Arab Christians and Muslims in the Levant
- Type: Popular feast day for women
- Significance: Honours the souls of the dead
- Celebrations: Festive family meals and the giving of food, coloured eggs and sweets to the poor, relatives and children
- Observances: Prayer, visiting cemeteries
- Date: On a Thursday that falls between the Easter Sundays of the Catholic and Eastern Orthodox traditions
- Frequency: Annual
- Related to: Easter, particularly Holy Thursday; possible relation to springtime Nebi Musa festival

Thursday of the Dead (Arabic: خميس الأموات, Khamis al-Amwat), also known as Thursday of the Secrets (Arabic: خميس الأسرار, Khamis al-Asrar) or Thursday of the Eggs, is a feast day shared by Christians and Muslims in the Levant. It falls sometime between the Easter Sundays of the Catholic and Eastern Orthodox Christian traditions. It is a day on which the souls of the dead are honoured. A popular day among women in the region, it underscores the shared culture between Arab Christians and Muslims.

== Overview ==
In Julian Morgenstern's The Rites of Birth, Marriage, Death, and Kindred Occasions Among the Semites (1966), Thursday of the Dead is described as a universal day for visiting tombs, engaged in most assiduously by townspeople, followed by fellaheen ("peasants"), and then Bedouins. Women would go to the cemetery before sunrise to pray for the departed and distribute bread cakes known as kaʿak al-asfar ("the yellow roll") and dried fruit to the poor, to children, and to relatives. Children would also receive painted eggs, generally yellow in colour.

The sharing of this tradition between Christians and Muslims is thought to date back to at least the 12th century when Saladin urged Muslims to adopt Christian customs in order to promote religious tolerance in the region. Anne Fuller sees in it "that ancient Near East belief that the living as well as the dead form a single community."

Salim Tamari places Thursday of the Dead three days before Easter Sunday (coinciding with Holy Thursday) and the day after Job's Wednesday (Arabic: Arba'at Ayyub), a quasi-religious mawsim (or seasonal festival) for Muslim peasants involving rituals at the sea.

In letters Lieutenant General Sir Charles Warren wrote while in Palestine in 1901, he said the day took place "in Spring, about the Greek Easter," and marked the culmination of seven consecutive Thursdays of wailing over the dead. A 1948 article in The Journal of the Palestine Oriental Society places the day's commemoration at fourteen days before the Good Friday of the Eastern church. An important day that is popular among women, the article says, "The visiting of the dead is in most cases very superficial, and the time is actually spent in good company out." The carrying of dyed eggs by the women of Jerusalem on their afternoon visits to cemeteries on Thursday of the Dead is noted by Morgenstern, who also writes that the day formed part of djum'et al-amwat ("week of the dead").

Frederick Jones Bliss' lecture on religions of Syria and Palestine in 1912 noted that Thursday of the Dead formed a part of Muslim mourning practices: "The cemetery may be visited every Thursday after the death occurs and then annually on the Thursday of the dead." The practice of distributing food to the needy by the family of the deceased at the tomb site which begins immediately after their death is considered rahmy ("mercy"), and according to the 1892-1893 Quarterly Statement of the Palestine Exploration Fund, this practice would continue through until the first Thursday of the Dead after the person's passing.

In Buarij, Portrait of a Lebanese Muslim Village (1961), Fuller lists Thursday of the Dead as one of a series of springtime rituals there, preceded by Thursday of the Animals and Thursday of the Plants, and followed by Thursday of the Jumping.

== Today ==
Commemorations of the day are less commonly observed throughout the region today, though the stamped cakes of bread (ka'ak al-asfar) continue to be distributed on the Thursday and Monday following the death of a family member and during the Easter season.

In the Syrian city of Homs, Thursday of the Dead is still commemorated in the same way. Many there now prefer to call it "Thursday of Sweetness", since the purchase of sweets by women and their distribution to children and the poor is seen as a double act of "sweetness".

== See also ==
- Bread stamp (signum pistoris)
- Day of the Dead
- Feast of Saint George
- Nabi Musa
- Pentecontad calendar

== Bibliography ==
- Frederick Jones Bliss (1912). The Religions of Modern Syria and Palestine: Lectures delivered before Lake Forest College on the foundation of the late William Bross. C. Scribner's sons.
- Fuller, Anne H. (1968). Buarij, Portrait of a Lebanese Muslim Village. Harvard University Press.
- Morgenstern, Julian (1966). The Rites of Birth, Marriage, Death, and Kindred Occasions Among the Semites. Hebrew Union College Press.
- Daniel Panzac (1995). Histoire économique et sociale de l'Empire ottoman et de la Turquie (1326-1960). Peeters Publishers. ISBN 90-6831-799-7.
