= More veneto =

Calendar used in the Venetian republic until 1797

The more veneto (M.V.) (Latin-Venetian 'in the Venetian manner') was the dating style used in the Republic of Venice, with the new year starting on March 1, Capodanno, New Year's Day. It was used with both the Julian and the Gregorian calendars.

Venice originally used the Julian calendar with March 25 as New Year's day, as usual elsewhere, but later shifted to March 1. This practice dates at least to the 11th century, but it is unclear when or why it was adopted. It may have inspired by the ancient Roman calendar.

Venice continued to use March 1 with the Gregorian calendar when it was adopted in 1582. So, for example, February 1700 A.D. corresponds to February 1699 M.V.

The more veneto was used until the Fall of the Venetian Republic in 1797.

== See also ==
- Mores
- Byzantine calendar
- Florentine calendar
- Pisan calendar
