= Pisan calendar =

Calendar used in the Republic of Pisa during the Middle Ages

The Pisan calendar, also referred to as the stile pisano ("Pisan style") or the calculus Pisanus ("Pisan calculation"), was the calendar used in the Republic of Pisa in Italy during the Middle Ages, which differed from the traditional Julian calendar.

== Beginning of the year ==
The Pisan year began on 25 March, and not on 1 January, with the apparent year lying ahead of the traditional Julian calendar. Thus, 24 March 1200 was followed by 25 March 1201 (not 1200, as it would remain in the Julian calendar), and 31 December 1201 would then be followed by 1 January 1201, which was the point at which the two calendars synchronised. This is the reason that most dates have an apparent discrepancy of one year, as the two calendars differ for just over nine months of each cycle. For example, a birth date of 10 September 1552 in Pisan reckoning translates to 10 September 1551 in the Julian calendar.

Beginning the year on a date other than 1 January was common during the mediaeval period. The first day of the year falling on 25 March meant that the Pisan calendar was in the stile dell'Annunciazione ("style of the Annunciation") or stile dell'Incarnazione ("style of the Incarnation") - also styled in Latin as ab [Dominica] incarnatione ("from the [Lord's] Incarnation") - by reference to the Solemnity of the Annunciation, and similar calendars saw use in Cortona and Pistoia. The Florentine, Sienese, English and Scottish calendars were also in this style, but confusingly ran behind the Julian calendar rather than ahead, resulting in them lying exactly one year behind of the Pisan calendar. By contrast, calendars in the stile della Natività ("style of the Nativity") as in Arezzo, Assisi and Perugia began on the Solemnity of the Nativity of the Lord (Christmas) on 25 December, the Venetian calendar began on 1 March until the Fall of the Venetian Republic, and the French year on Easter day until 1564. The traditional Julian calendar was sometimes said to be in the stile della Circoncisione ("style of the Circumcision"). See beginning of the year.

== End of use ==
Italy was one of the few regions to immediately convert from the Julian calendar to the Gregorian: 4 October 1582 was followed by 15 October 1582, the latter being the first day of the new Gregorian calendar. Not until 1749, however, were the ancient calendars definitively outlawed in Tuscany: in that year the recently appointed Grand Duke and Holy Roman Emperor, Francis I, ordered that, starting from 1750, the first of January should become the first day of the year, thus having the "peoples of Tuscia" conform to all the others. A plaque in Latin commemorating the grand ducal/imperial decree is affixed to the west wall of the Loggia dei Lanzi, in Piazza della Signoria in Florence. (Note: The plaque is reproduced online and translated into Italian at the "FlorencewithGuide" website (Silvia Bonacini, Il calendario fiorentino). Two similar plaques are affixed in Pisa and Siena.)
