= Haabʼ =

Part of the Maya calendric system

Today (at UTC+00)
- Saturday, 3 October 2026
- Maya: 13.0.13.17.14; 7 Yax, 7 Ix
Other calendars
Akan	Nwonamemene
Armenian	15 Sahmi 1476
Aztec	Izcalli 1, 7 Ocēlōtl
Babylonian	20 Ululu, 2337 SE
Balinese pawukon	Menga, Beteng, Menala, Pon, Aryang, Saniscara of Ugu, Yama, Tulus, Manusa
Bengali	18 Ashshin, BS 1433
Chinese	Yang Metal Dog・Stomach Mansion; Fire Horse Year, Month 8, Day 23 (Qiufen, 5 days until Hanlu)
Common Era	3 October 2026 CE
Coptic	23 Thout, AM 1743
Egyptian	20 Mechir, 2775 NE
Ethiopian	23 Maskaram, 2019 Amätä Məhrät
French Republican	Décade II, Primidi de Vendémiaire de l'Année 235 de la République
Gregorian	3 October, AD 2026
Hebrew	22 Tishrei, AM 5787
Hindu	Ārdrā・Varīyas; Solar: 17 Āśvina, 1948 SE; Lunisolar: Saptamī, Kṛishna pakṣa of Bhādrapada, 2083 VE; Rāudra・5127 KY・1,872,851
Icelandic	Laugardagur, 10 Haustmánuður 2026
Islamic	20 Rabi' al-thani, AH 1448 (using tabular method)
ISO week date	2026-W40-6
Japanese	23 Hazuki, Reiwa 8 (Shūbun, 5 days until Kanro)
Julian	20 September, AD 2026 (AM 7534)
Julian day	2461317
Korean	23 Dakdal, 4359 DE
Roman	ante diem XII Kalendas Octobres, MMDCCLXXIX AUC
Solar Hijri	11 Mehr, SH 1405
Tibetan	22 khrums, me pho rta 2153 or 1772 or 1000

The Haabʼ (Mayan pronunciation: [haːɓ]) is part of the Maya calendric system. It was a 365-day calendar used by many of the pre-Columbian cultures of Mesoamerica.

== Description ==
Haabʼ months: names in glyphs in sequence
N^{o.} Seq.	Name of month	Glyph examples	glyph meaning	N^{o.} Seq.	Name of month	Glyph examples	glyph meaning
1	Pop		mat	10	Yax		green storm
2	Woʼ		black conjunction	11	Sakʼ		white storm
3	Sip		red conjunction	12	Keh		red storm
4	Sotzʼ		bat	13	Mak		enclosed
5	Sek		death	14	Kʼankʼin		yellow sun
6	Xul		dog	15	Muwan		owl
7	Yaxkʼin		new sun	16	Pax		planting time
8	Mol		water	17	Kʼayabʼ		turtle
9	Chʼen		black storm	18	Kumkʼu		granary
				19	Wayebʼ		five unlucky days

The Haabʼ comprises eighteen months of twenty days each, plus an additional period of five days ("nameless days") at the end of the year known as Wayeb' (or Uayeb in 16th-century orthography).

Bricker (1982) estimates that the Haabʼ was first used around 500 BCE with a starting point of the winter solstice.

The Haabʼ month names are most commonly referred to by their names in colonial-era Yucatec (Yukatek). In sequence, these (in the revised orthography) are as seen on the right: Each day in the Haabʼ calendar was identified by a day number within the month followed by the name of the month. Day numbers began with a glyph translated as the "seating of" a named month, which is usually regarded as day 0 of that month, although a minority treat it as day 20 of the month preceding the named month. In the latter case, the seating of Pop is day 5 of Wayebʼ. For the majority, the first day of the year was Seating Pop. This was followed by 1 Pop, 2 Pop ... 19 Pop, Seating Wo, 1 Wo and so on.

Inscriptions on The Temple of the Cross at Palenque shows clearly that the Maya were aware of the true length of the year, even though they did not employ the use of leap days in their system of calculations generally. J. Eric Thompson wrote that the Maya knew of the drift between the Haabʼ and the solar year and that they made "calculations as to the rate at which the error accumulated, but these were merely noted as corrections they were not used to change the calendar."

=== Five unlucky days ===
The five nameless days at the end of the calendar, called Wayebʼ, was thought to be a dangerous time. Foster (2002) writes "During Wayeb, portals between the mortal realm and the Underworld dissolved. No boundaries prevented the ill-intending deities from causing disasters." To ward off these evil spirits, the Mayans had customs and rituals they practised during Wayebʼ. For example, the Mayans would not leave their homes and wash their hair.
