= 365-day calendar =

A 365-day calendar consists of exactly 365 days per year (in common years), and is primarily used in computer models and as an assumption in every-day calculations. For example, a calculation of a daily rate may use an annual total divided by exactly 365.

Interest rates in some banks are calculated using a 365-day calendar.

== Other 365-day calendars ==
Some Mesoamerican calendars used a 365-day year with no leap year, resulting in a gradual shift of the seasons relative to the calendar. This includes the Maya Haab' and the Aztec Xiuhpohualli calendars.

Some versions of the Zoroastrian calendar also use a fixed length of 365 days with no rule for leap days, despite potential leap year rules being acknowledged by the 9th century at the latest. In particular, of the versions still in use today the Qadimi version does not have any form of leap rule; the Shahanshahi version had one leap month added in the 12th century but no leap years since, while the Fasli version (introduced in the 20th century) adds one day every four years.

== See also ==
- 360-day calendar
