= Cosmic Calendar =

Method to visualize the chronology of the universe

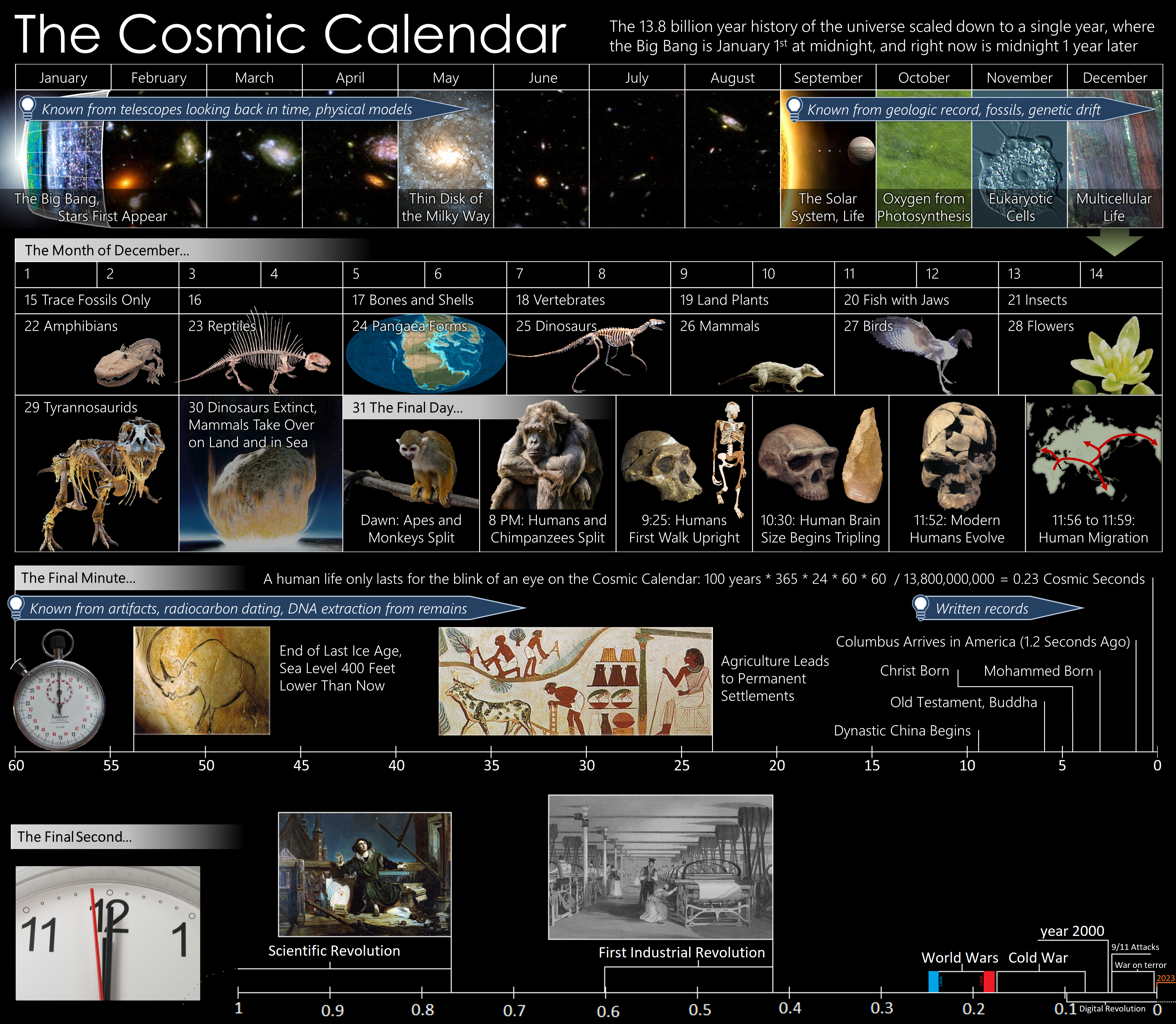
A graphical view of the Cosmic Calendar, featuring the months of the year, days of December, the final minute, and the final second

Video of the calendar

The Cosmic Calendar is a method to visualize the chronology of the universe, scaling its currently understood age of 13.787 billion years to a single year in order to help intuit it for pedagogical purposes in science education or popular science. A similar analogy used to visualize the geologic time scale and the history of life on Earth is the Geologic Calendar.

In this visualization, the Big Bang took place at the beginning of January 1 at midnight, and the current moment maps onto the end of December 31 just before midnight. At this scale, there are 438 years per cosmic second, 1.58 million years per cosmic hour, and 37.8 million years per cosmic day.

The Solar System materialized in Cosmic September. The Phanerozoic corresponds only to the latter half of December, with the Cenozoic only happening on the penultimate day on the Calendar. The Quaternary only applies to the last four hours on the final Cosmic Day, with the Holocene only applying to the final 23 Cosmic Seconds. On the other hand, relic radiation is dated at the first fifteen minutes of the very first Cosmic Day; even if we stretch the Cosmic Calendar to 100 years, the relic radiation would still happen just after the start of the second Cosmic Day.

The concept was popularized by Carl Sagan in his 1977 book The Dragons of Eden and on his 1980 television series Cosmos. Sagan goes on to extend the comparison in terms of surface area, explaining that if the Cosmic Calendar were scaled to the size of a football field, then "all of human history would occupy an area the size of [his] hand". The Cosmic Calendar was reused in the 2014 series Cosmos: A Spacetime Odyssey.

The Cosmic Calendar is significantly mentioned in Samantha Harvey's novel Orbital.

== Cosmology ==
| Date | Gya (billion years ago) | Event |
|---|---|---|
| 1 January, 0:00 | 13.787 | The Big Bang |
| 1 January, 0:14 | 13.787 | The cosmic background radiation. Would have been last emitted 14 minutes after midnight |
| 1 January, 0:30 | 13.787 | First atoms |
| 19 January | 13 | GRB 090423, Oldest known Gamma Ray Burst |
| 26 January | 12.85 | First galaxies form |
| 1 March | 11 | Milky Way Galaxy formed |
| 13 May | 8.8 | Milky Way Galaxy disk formed |
| 9 September | 4.57 | Formation of the Solar System |
| 14 September | 4.5 | Formation of the Earth and The Moon |

Date in year calculated from formula

T(days) = 365 days * ( 1- T_Gya/13.787)

== Evolution of life on Earth ==
| Date | Gya (billion years ago) | Event |
|---|---|---|
| 14 September | 4.1 | First known remains of biotic life (discovered in 4.1 billion-year-old rocks in Western Australia). |
| 21 September | 3.8 | First Life (Prokaryotes) |
| 30 September | 3.4 | Photosynthesis |
| 29 October | 2.4 | Oxygenation of atmosphere |
| 9 November | 2 | Complex cells (Eukaryotes) |
| 5 December | 0.8 | First multicellular life |
| 7 December | 0.67 | Simple animals |
| 14 December | 0.55 | Arthropods (ancestors of insects, arachnids) |
| 17 December | 0.53 | Fish and Proto-amphibians |
| 18 December | 0.518 | Vertebrates |
| 19 December | 0.45 | Land plants; Ordovician–Silurian extinction events |
| 20 December | 0.4 | Jawed fish |
| 21 December | 0.35 | Insects and seeds |
| 22 December | 0.33 | Amphibians; Late Devonian extinction |
| 23 December | 0.3 | Reptiles |
| 24 December | 0.25 | Permian–Triassic extinction event; 57% of all biological families and 83% of all genera die |
| 25 December | 0.23 | Dinosaurs |
| 26 December | 0.201 | Mammals; Triassic–Jurassic extinction event |
| 27 December | 0.15 | Birds (avian dinosaurs) |
| 28 December | 0.13 | Flowers |
| 30 December, 6:24 | 0.066 | Cretaceous–Paleogene extinction event, non-avian dinosaurs go extinct; Primates |

== Human evolution ==
| Date / time | Mya (million years ago) | Event |
|---|---|---|
| 31 December, 6:05 | 28 | Apes |
| 31 December, 14:24 | 12.3 | Hominids |
| 31 December, 20:00 | 7 | Chimpanzees and Humans split |
| 31 December, 22:24 | 2.8 | Homos and stone tools |
| 31 December, 23:44 | 0.4 | Domestication of fire |
| 31 December, 23:52 | 0.2 | Humans |
| 31 December, 23:55 | 0.115 | Beginning of most recent Glacial Period |
| 31 December, 23:58 | 0.035 | Sculpture and painting |
| 31 December, 23:59:32 | 0.012 | Agriculture |

== History begins ==
| Date / time | kya (thousand years ago) | Event |
|---|---|---|
| 31 December, 23:59:33 | 11.7 | End of the last Ice Age |
| 31 December, 23:59:41 | 8.3 | Flooding of Doggerland |
| 31 December, 23:59:46 | 6 | Chalcolithic |
| 31 December, 23:59:47 | 5.5 | Early Bronze Age; proto-writing; building of Stonehenge Cursus |
| 31 December, 23:59:48 | 5 | First Dynasty of Egypt, Early Dynastic period in Sumer, beginning of Indus Valley civilisation |
| 31 December, 23:59:49 | 4.5 | Alphabet, Akkad, wheel |
| 31 December, 23:59:51 | 4 | Code of Hammurabi, Middle Kingdom of Egypt |
| 31 December, 23:59:52 | 3.5 | Late Bronze Age to early Iron Age; Minoan eruption |
| 31 December, 23:59:53 | 3 | Iron Age; beginning of classical antiquity |
| 31 December, 23:59:54 | 2.5 | Buddha, Mahavira, Zoroaster, Confucius, Achaemenid Empire, Qin dynasty, Classical Greece, Ashokan Empire, Vedas completed, Euclidean geometry, Archimedean physics, Roman Republic |
| 31 December, 23:59:55 | 2 | Ptolemaic astronomy, Roman Empire, Jesus, invention of numeral 0, Gupta Empire |
| 31 December, 23:59:56 | 1.5 | Muhammad, Maya civilization, Song dynasty, Black Death, Byzantine Empire |
| 31 December, 23:59:58 | 1 | Mongol Empire, Maratha Empire, crusades, Christopher Columbus voyages to the Americas, Renaissance in Europe, Classical music to the time of Johann Sebastian Bach |
| 31 December, 23:59:59 | 0.5 | Modern history; the last 437.5 years before present. 7 Years War, American and French Revolutions, airplanes, World War 1 and 2, computers, spaceflight, first human landing on The Moon |
