= Kurdish calendar =

Calendar used in Kurdistan, Iraq

Today's Kurdish Date
- 15 Gelarêzan 2726 15ی گەڵاڕێزانی 2726

The Kurdish calendar (Kurdish: ڕۆژژمێری کوردی, Salnameya kurdî) is a solar calendar used by Kurds to mark years, months, and seasonal cycles. The calendar begins each year on Newroz (21 March in the Gregorian calendar), corresponding to the spring vernal equinox. It consists of twelve months of 30 or 31 days with traditional Kurdish month names associated with seasonal changes and agricultural activities such as harvesting. The calendar is used alongside the Islamic calendar and the Gregorian calendar, and is formally recognized for cultural and official use in the Kurdistan Region of Iraq.

== History ==
The start of the calendar is marked by the Battle of Nineveh, a conquest of the Assyrians by the Medes in 612 BC.

== Months ==
The names for the months are often derived from society's events in that month.

Order	Name	Romanized	Other Names	Days	Approximate Gregorian Span	Likely Meaning
1	خاکەلێوە	Xakelêwe	نەورۆز	31	March 21 – April 20	Thawing earth or spring onset.
2	گوڵان	Gulan		31	April 21 – May 21	Derived from the word Gul (flower). It likely represents the season of growing spring flowers across Kurdistan.
3	جۆزەردان	Cozerdan	زەردان	31	May 22 – June 21	Barley or yellow grain harvest.
4	پووشپەڕ	Pûşper		31	June 22 – July 22	Dry grass or winged abundance.
5	گەلاوێژ	Gelawêj		31	July 23 – August 22	Named after the Gelawêj star (Sirius) that becomes visible this month; marks its heliacal rising or intense heat.
6	خەرمانان	Xermanan	خەرمان، جۆخینان	31	August 23 – September 22	Threshing or harvest time.
7	ڕەزبەر	Rezber	بەران	30	September 23 – October 22	Fruit ripening or the onset of autumn rain.
8	گەڵاڕێزان	Gelarêzan	خەزەڵوەر، خەزان، گێزان	30	October 23 – November 21	Autumn leaf fall.
9	سەرماوەز	Sermawez	ساران	30	November 22 – December 21	Cold mists or the onset of winter.
10	بەفرانبار	Befranbar	بەفران، بەرفانبار	30	December 22 – January 20	Derived from the word Befr (snow); signifies snow accumulation.
11	ڕێبەندان	Rêbendan		30	January 21 – February 19	Snow-blocked paths.
12	ڕەشەمە	Reşeme	ڕەشەمێ	29/30	February 20 – March 20	Blackened or dark winds. It is also historically associated with the melting of snow, which exposes the dark earth beneath.
