= Ancient Greek calendars =

Chronometry

Various ancient Greek calendars began in most states of ancient Greece between autumn and winter except for the Attic calendar, which began in summer.

The Greeks, as early as the time of Homer, appear to have been familiar with the division of the year into the twelve lunar months but no intercalary month Embolimos or day is then mentioned, with twelve months totaling 354 days. Independent of the division of a month into days, it was divided into periods according to the increase and decrease of the moon. Each of the city-states in ancient Greece had their own calendar that was based on the cycle of the moon, but also the various religious festivals that occurred throughout the year.

The Greeks attributed and dedicated each day of the month to a different entity, such as the seventh to Apollo. The month in which the year began, as well as the names of the months, differed among the states, and in some parts even no names existed for the months, as they were distinguished only numerically, as the first, second, third, fourth month, etc. Another way that scholars kept time was referred to as the Olympiad. This meant that the Olympic Games had just occurred and according to the four-year span, the games would not be held for another three years. Of primary importance for the reconstruction of the regional Greek calendars is the calendar of Delphi, because of the numerous documents found there recording the manumission of slaves, many of which are dated both in the Delphian and in a regional calendar.

It was not until the second century BCE that the ancient Greek calendars adopted a numerical system for naming months. It is theorized that this was more for uniformity across the regions than to secularize the calendar. The newly numerical calendars were also created in regions federated from the leagues of Phokis, Ozolian Locris, and Akhaia.

Below are fifteen regions of the ancient Greek world and the corresponding information of the yearly calendar.

== Calendars by region ==
In the following tables the month names used in each Greek-speaking city are laid out with Athenian Greek letters (not necessarily how they were spelled in the city they were used in) transliterated into English letters, and with a leading ordinal number column. The ordinal column is mostly for reference, and should not be read too literally: Different cities started their calendar year at different points in the solar year, and the month-numbers do not (necessarily) reflect the start date, which for some cities is not known. Not all of the calendars are equally well-known, and confidence and uncertainties are discussed under individual headings, below. Calendars changed from time-to-time and from city-state to city-state on an irregular basis, sometimes for intercalation.

=== Aetolian ===
The months of the Aetolian calendar have been presented by Daux (1932) based on arguments by Nititsky (1901) based on synchronisms in manumission documents found at Delphi (dated to the 2nd century BCE). The intercalary month was Dios, attested as Dios embolimos in SEG SVI 344, equivalent to Delphian Poitropoios ho deuteros. The month Boukatios corresponds to Delphian Daidaphorios, while Delphian Boukatios is Aetolian Panamos. There has been no argument to dispute the order of months, so the months found by scholars are agreed upon to be the most likely for the time. Unfortunately, there is no convenient table that describes the synchronisms, as one inscription is given for all the months. The only month to have a singular document describing it is the eleventh month, in comparison to the other numerous documents for the rest of the calendar. The Aetolian calendar was used across the League, and additionally, one could find the Aetolian calendar in use across western central Greece until the league dissolved circa the second century BCE. (Note: See Ancient Greek phonology for the pronunciation of the letters.)

Lunar months at Aetolia
1	Prokúklios	Προκύκλιος
2	Athanaíos	Ἀθαναίος
3	Boukátios	Βουκάτιος
4	Diós	Διός
5	Euthaíos	Ἑυθυαίος
6	Homolṓios	Ὁμολώιος
7	Hermaíos	Ἑρμαίος
8	Dionúsios	Διονύσιος
9	Agúeios	Ἀγύειος
10	Hippodrómios	Ἱπποδρόμιος
11	Laphraíos	Λαφραίος
12	Pánamos	Πάναμος

=== Argolian ===
Lunar months at Argos
1	Ermaíos	Ἐρμαίος
2	Agios	Ἄγιος
3	Ardios	Ἄρδιος
4	Gamos	Γαμος
5	Erithaíeos	Ἐριθαίεος
6	Pánamos	Πάναμος
7	Téleos	Τέλεος
8	Kárneios	Κάρνειος
9	Agriánios	Ἀγριάνιος
10	Ardamítēs	Ἀρδαμίτης
11	Amúklaios	Ἀμύκλαιος
12	Ampenaíos	Ἀμπεναίος

=== Attic ===
The Attic calendar, otherwise known as the Athenian calendar, is one of the best known regional calendars in Greece. There are numerous articles that can detail what the months are named and how the calendar came to be attested. The Attic calendar consisted of twelve months and twenty-nine to thirty days, much like the calendar now. Occasionally, the Attic calendar would be thirteen months and have an intercalary year to keep the festivals aligned with the differing seasons. Additionally, the Attic calendar created extra days to have the festivals align with the lunar cycle.

==== Festival calendar ====
With the festival version of the calendar, the months were named after the chief of the festival that corresponded to the lunar cycle. The years were also named after an administrator, the eponymous archon, who had served that year.

Months that had thirty days in them were referred to as Full months while months with twenty-nine days were referred to as Hollow months. This was due to the lunar cycle, and that two lunar cycles was approximately 59.06 days to them. There is additional evidence to suggest that the Attic months can be aligned with the months we have now for comparison. Such is as follows:

Lunar months at Athens
No.	Month	Greek	Calendar month
1	Hekatombaiṓn	Ἑκατομβαιών	July–August
2	Metageitniṓn	Μεταγειτνιών	August–September
3	Boēdromiṓn	Βοηδρομιών	September–October
4	Pyanepsiṓn	Πυανεψιών	October–November
5	Maimaktēriṓn	Μαιμακτηριών	November–December
6	Poseideṓn	Ποσιδεών (later Ποσειδεών)	December–January
7	Gamēliṓn	Γαμηλιών	January–February
8	Anthestēriṓn	Ἀνθεστηριών	February–March
9	Elaphēboliṓn	Ἐλαφηβολιών	March–April
10	Mounichiṓn	Μουνυχιών (later Μουνιχιών)	April–May
11	Thargēliṓn	Θαργηλιών	May–June
12	Skirophoriṓn	Σκιροφοριών	June–July

==== Civil calendar ====
Along with the festival calendar, the Athenian calendar had a civil calendar that coexisted and was based upon the prytanies (periods when each of the tribes served on the council). These months were thirty-six or thirty-seven days long and divided into a group of six prytanies and a group of four. This then created a ten month calendar that could be used to refer to time as well as the twelve month calendar.

The main reason this calendar existed was to keep track of the financial transactions within the Assembly. Each month lasted between thirty-five and thirty-eight days that made up the additional months in the festival calendar and ran from midsummer to midsummer. However, due to the number of tribes changing constantly, this calendar changed with them. Hence the separation between the festivals and a financial calendar. Many accounts of the financial calendar come from various writings and inscriptions from the reigns of Archons. All evidence of the calendars supports the theory that the Athenians never aligned their calendars or devised a system to draw links between certain days. Scholars assume that people referred to the calendars separately for different occasions with different people.

Administrative periods at Athens
1	Eréktheis	Ερέκθεις
2	Aigís	Αιγίς
3	Pandiṓnēs	Πανδιώνης
4	Leontḗs	Λεοντής
5	Akamántēs	Ακαμάντης
6	Oinḗ	Οινή
7	Kekrópēs	Κεκρόπης
8	Hippothṓntēs	Ιπποθώντης
9	Aiántēs	Αιάντης
10	Antiókhēs	Αντιόκης

=== Boeotian ===
The history on the Boeotian calendar is very limited as not many detailed records were kept. All months were named, numbered, and adjusted according to the seasons to fit the lunar year. A calendar was used as a reference in archaic times that bore resemblance to better known Greek city-states and their calendar systems. Any early evidence of the Boeotian calendar comes from Hesiod and is debated for interpretation. Hesiod's recollection of the months includes only one (Ληναιων – Lēnaiōn) and this does not appear on any of the other calendars associated with Boeotia. This gap in information suggests to scholars a change in the organizing of months between the archaic and classic times in Boeotia. As most other regions in Greece, Boeotia divided their calendar months into thirds, but had differing ways to count the days. One system represented the days by ordinal numbers, another used common Greek terms to divide the months in half, and the third system indicated a division of the month into decads. With such a diversity in how the months themselves were categorized, it is hard for historians to give a definitive answer on the calendar.

Lunar months in Boeotia
1	Bukátios	Βουκάτιος
2	Hermaíos	Ἑρμαίος
3	Prostatḗrios	Προστατήριος
4	Agriṓnios	Ἀγριώνιος
5	Thioúios	Θιούιος
6	Homolṓios	Ὁμολώιος
7	Theiloúthios	Θειλούθιος
8	Hippodrómios	Ἱπποδρόμιος
9	Pánamos	Πάναμος
10	Pamboiṓtios	Παμβοιώτιος
11	Damátrios	Δαμάτριος
12	Alalkoménios or Alkuménios	Ἀλαλκομένιος or Ἀλκυμένιος

=== Corinthian ===
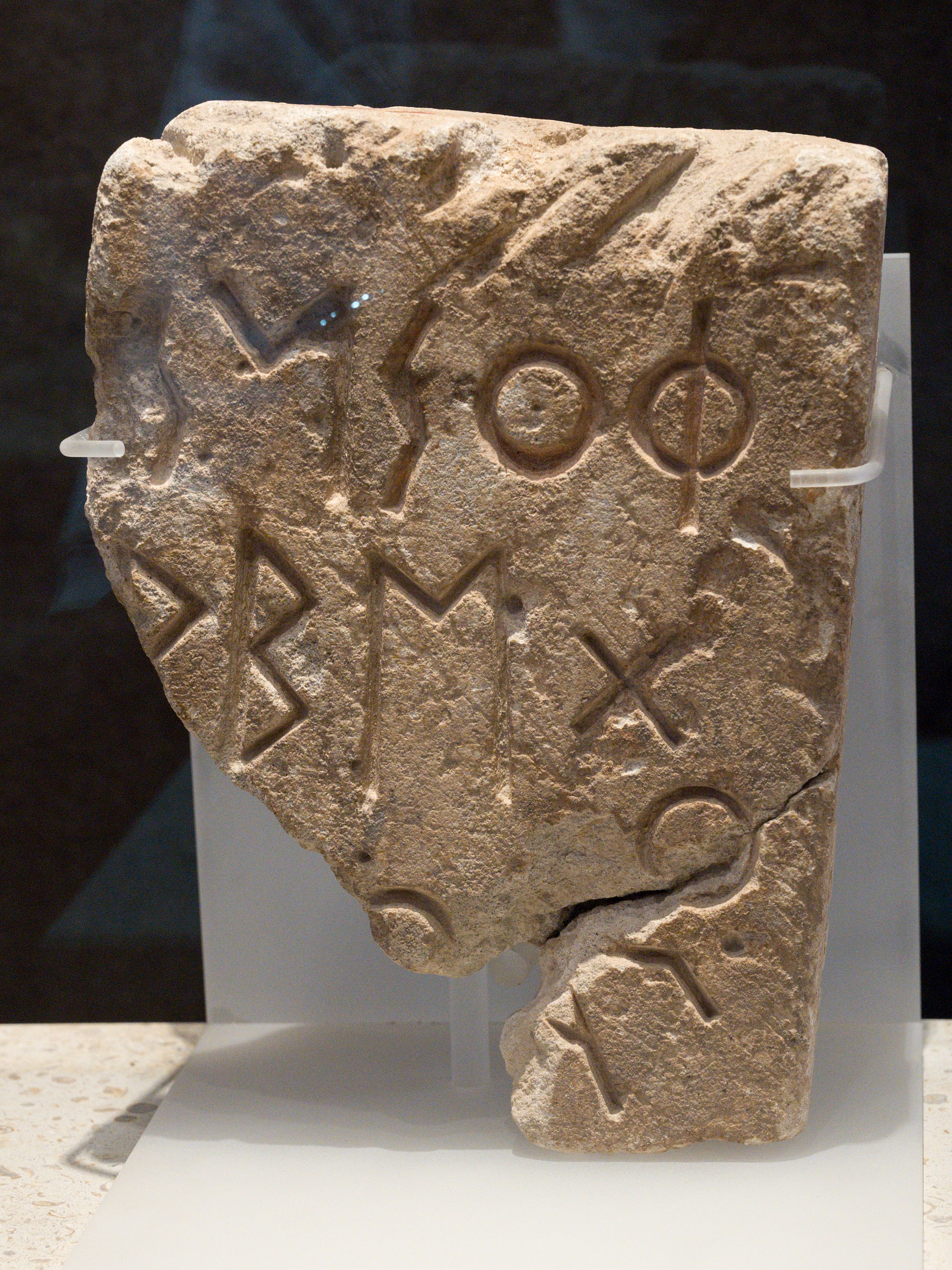
A 6th century BC Corinthian inscription, mentionaing the month Phoinikaios

The month names of one Corinthian calendar that belongs to the larger family of the Doric calendars, is an Epirotic calendar are inscribed in order on the dial of the Antikythera mechanism.

Lunar months at Corinth
1	Phoinikaíos	Φοινικαίος
2	Kráneios	Κράνειος
3	Lanotrópios, or Heliotrópios, or Haliotrópios	Λανοτρόπιος or Ἑλιοτρόπιος or Ἁλιοτρόπιος
4	Machaneus	Μαχανεύς
5	Dodekateús	Δωδεκατεύς
6	Eûkleios	Εὔκλειος
7	Artemísios	Ἀρτεμίσιος
8	Psydreús	Ψυδρεύς
9	Gamílios	Γαμείλιος
10	Agriánios	Ἀγριάνιος
11	Pánamos	Πάναμος
12	Apellaĩos	Ἀπελλαῖος

=== Cretan ===
Lunar months on Crete
1	Thesmophoríōn	Θεσμοφορίων
2	Hermaîos	Ἑρμαῖος
3	Imánios	Ιμάνιος
4	Metárkhios	Μετάρχιος
5	Agúeios	Αγύειος
6	Dióskouros	Διόσκουρος
7	Theodósios	Θεοδόσιος
8	Póntios	Πόντιος
9	Rhabínthios	Ραβίνθιος
10	Huperberetaíos	Υπερβερεταίος
11	Nekúsios	Νεκύσιος
12	Basíleios	Βασίλειος

=== Delphic ===
Lunar months at Delphi
1	Boukátios	Βουκάτιος
2	Hēraíos	Ἡραίος
3	Apellaíos	Ἀπελλαίος (first month of the year)
4	Enduiópeios	Ενδυιόπειος
5	Dadaphórios	Δαδαφόριος
6	Poitrópios	Ποιτρόπιος
7	Búsios	Βύσιος
8	Amálios	Αμάλιος
9	Hērákleios	Ἡράκλειος
10	Boathóos	Βοαθόος
11	Ilaíos	Ιλαίος
12	Theoxénios	Θεοξένιος

=== Elian ===
Information about the Elian calendar is scarce and very desolate. Most of the information found depends upon a scholar by the name of Pindar, and while he names some months and the organization of the calendar, much is still unknown. Pindar's work is left to interpretation, and as such, causes dispute among scholars to which version is correct. The one conclusion that is well known depends upon the Elian calendar beginning at the time of the winter solstice. However, this is still contested as to why the calendar would have a relationship with the seasons, when it may not have revolved around them in the past. As most other calendars agree, there is much evidence to suggest that the Olympic Games were hosted in the summertime, which would be reasonable to suggest this as the beginning of the year. This is the case with Athens and many regions would model their calendar after it. It would be reasonable to conclude that Elis would follow this example also, which refutes the idea of beginning at the winter solstice.

Lunar months on Elis
1	—?—	—?—
2	Apollṓnios	Ἀπολλώνιος
3	Parthénios	Παρθένιος
4	Alphioíos	Ἀλφιοίος
5	Athanaíos	Ἀθαναίος
6	Thuḯos	Θυΐος
7	—?—	—?—
8	Diósthuos	Διόσθυος
9	—?—	—?—
10	Eláphios	Ελάφιος
11	—?—	—?—
12	—?—	—?—

=== Epidaurian ===
The Epidaurian calendar was from the Epidauros region in ancient Greece and most extensively declared to be the formal calendar in circa fourth century BCE. Construction of the calendar was put into effect by a German born mathematician named Abraham Fraenkel, and appears to be the most widely accepted version of the order.

Lunar months at Epidauros
1	Azosios	Αζόσιος
2	Kárneios	Κάρνειος
3	Prarátios	Πραράτιος
4	Hermaios	Ερμαίος
5	Gámos	Γάμος
6	Teleos	Τέλεος
7	Posidaios	Ποσίδαιος
8	Artamisios	Αρταμίσιος
9	Agriánios	Αγριάνιος
10	Pánamos	Πάναμος
11	Kyklios	Κύκλιος
12	Apellaios	Απελλαίος

=== Laconian ===
Laconian calendar has several months that are presumed to follow the Spartan calendar, and even include a few of the same months (Ἑκατομβεύς, Κάρνειος, Ἡράσιος). As so many months are attested to be Spartan or belong to the surrounding Spartan areas, it is presumed that Sparta and Laconia could have shared a calendar. There is very little epigraphical data for the names of days in the Laconian calendar. The calendar has a few numerals associated with the days, but there is no way to specifically determine terminology for any of the days.

Lunar months in Laconia
1	Pánamos	Πάναμος
2	Hērásios	Ἡράσιος
3	Apellaíos	Ἀπελλαίος
4	Diósthuos	Διόσθυος
5	—?—	—?—
6	Eleusínios	Ελευσίνιος
7	Gerástios	Γεράστιος
8	Artemísios	Ἀρτεμίσιος
9	Delphínios	Δελφίνιος
10	Phleiásios	Φλειάσιος
11	Hekatombeús	Ἑκατομβεύς
12	Kárneios	Κάρνειος

=== Locris ===
Locris itself appears to be divided into Eastern Locris and Ozolian Locris. Eastern Locris has almost no remains for its calendars, but still enough to show that two neighboring towns would have different calendars, as far back as the first century BCE. Three months in the Eastern Locris calendar have comparable months with Skarpheia and two months have comparable months with Thronion. Neither Skarpheia nor Thronion can shed light on the order of the months though. Additionally, only one date is confirmed and it corresponds to the month found in the Thronion calendar. This date is known as τεσσαραχαιδεχάτα.

==== Skarpheia months ====
- Aphámius – Άφάμιος
- Ermáuios – Έρμάυιος
- Phúllikhos – Φύλλιχος

==== Thronion months ====
- Itṓuios – Ἱτώυιος
- Hippeíos – Ἱππείος

The Ozolian Locris calendar came into being after Locris broke free of Aetolia's reign after the dissolvement of the Aetolian League. This is when an affirmed calendar has been located, reaching back as for as the second century BCE. All of the months found in the Ozolian Locris calendar have been attested except for the second, ninth, and eleventh month. In particular, the Ozolian Locris calendar aligns with the Delphian calendar to show that the first month corresponds to Boukatios at Delphi, and the rest follow sequentially. However, most of the information known about Locrian months comes from Delphi, and very little is indigenous to Locris.

As for days, only the first twenty days are confirmed in the calendar. Earlier translations lean toward the dialect with alpha, while later ones use the koine form with eta. It is not until before the first century of the Christian era that numerical names begin.

==== Ozolian Locris ordinal months ====
The month names used in Locris, in Ozolia, are simple ordinal numbers.

Lunar months in Locris
1	Prṓtos	Πρώτος	First
2	Deúteros	Δεύτερος	Second
3	Trítos	Τρίτος	Third
4	Tétartos	Τέταρτος	Fourth
5	Pémptos	Πέμπτος	Fifth
6	Héktos	Ἕκτος	Sixth
7	Hébdomos	Ἕβδομος	Seventh
8	Ógdoos	Ὄγδοος	Eighth
9	Énatos	Ἐνατος	Ninth
10	Dékatos	Δέκατος	Tenth
11	Endékatos	Ἐνδέκατος	Eleventh
12	Dōdékatos	Δωδέκατος	Twelfth

=== Macedonian ===
Lunar months in Macedon
1	Díos	Δίος
2	Apellaîos	Ἀπελλαῖος
3	Audunaîos or Audnaîos	Αὐδυναῖος or Αὐδναῖος
4	Perítios	Περίτιος
5	Dústros	Δύστρος
6	Xandikós or Xanthikós	Ξανδικός or Ξανθικός
7	Artemísios or Artamítios	Ἀρτεμίσιος or Ἀρταμίτιος
8	Daísios	Δαίσιος
9	Pánēmos or Pánamos	Πάνημος or Πάναμος
10	Lṓios	Λώιος
11	Gorpiaîos	Γορπιαῖος
12	Huperberetaîos	Ὑπερβερεταῖος

=== Rhodian ===
Evidence for the Rhodian calendar is plentiful and comes from a multitude of inscriptions. All of the months in the year are presented and attested for, as well the count of days. However, while the names are known, the order and organization of the months is not a definitive answer. For the amount of resources found on the actual calendar, very few ancient sources mention the calendar in their writings. With the plethora of information accessible, the Rhodian calendar is one studied almost as extensively as the Athenian calendar.

Lunar months on Rhodes
1	Agriánios	Ἀγριάνιος
2	Badrómios	Βαδρόμιος
3	Theudásios	Θευδάσιος
4	Dálios	Δάλιος
5	Artamítios	Ἀρταμίτιος
6	Pánamos	Πάναμος
‡	Pánamos; Embólimos	Πάναμος; Ἐμβόλιμος
7	Pedageitnúos	Πεδαγειτνύος
8	Huakinthios	Ὑακίνθιος
9	Kárneios	Κάρνειος
10	Thesmophórios	Θεσμοφόριος (first month of the year)
11	Smínthios	Σμίνθιος
12	Diósthuos	Διόσθυος

‡ Pánamos Embólimos was technically the 13th month added to the year to re‑align the lunar months with the seasonal year, but it was placed between the usual 6th and 7th months, as a second, or doubled Pánamos, rather than at the end of the year.

=== Sicilian ===
Lunar months in Sicily
1	Thesmophórios	Θεσμοφόριος
2	Dálios	Δάλιος
3	—?—	—?—
4	Agriánios	Αγριάνιος
5	—?—	—?—
6	Theudásios	Θευδάσιος
7	Artemítios	Αρτεμίτιος
8	—?—	
9	Badrómios	Βαδρόμιος
10	Huakínthios	Ὑακίνθιος
11	Kárneios	Κάρνειος
12	Pánamos	Πάναμος

=== Thessalian ===
There was no single Thessalian calendar prior to 196 BC. Individual poleis maintained local calendars tied to civic cults and festivals, but no pre-196 BC Thessalian calendar is preserved in full. These local calendars continued under Macedonian rule. After the Roman victory at Cynoscephalae, the general Flamininus reorganized the Thessalian League, after which a common federal calendar was adopted. It may have drawn on earlier civic calendars: all four pre-Flamininan month names attested at Larisa also occur in the federal calendar. The federal year was divided into two six-month periods (ἑξάμηνοι), the πρώτη ἑξάμηνος (“first six-month period”) and δευτέρα ἑξάμηνος (“second six-month period”), which could define the terms of office of certain magistrates. As neighbouring perioikoi were incorporated into the League, they adopted the federal calendar at varying rates. Magnesia remained politically separate and did not adopt it. The twelve-month sequence of the common federal calendar adopted after 196 BC is shown below.

Lunar months in Thessaly
1	Itṓnios	Ἰτώνιος
2	Pánēmos	Πάνημος
3	Themístios	Θεμίστιος
4	Agagúlios	Ἀγαγύλιος
5	Apollõnios	Ἀπολλώνιος
6	Hermaîos	Ἑρμαῖος
7	Leskhanórios	Λεσχανόριος
8	Áphrios	Ἄφριος
9	Thuîos	Θυῖος
10	Homolṓios	Ὁμολῴιος
11	Hippodrómios	Ἱπποδρόμιος
12	Phullikós	Φυλλικός

== See also ==
- Ancient Greek astronomy
- Successor calendars:
  - Roman calendar
  - Julian calendar
  - Byzantine calendar

== Bibliography ==
- Samuel, Alan Edouard (1972). Greek and Roman Chronology: Calendars and years in classical antiquity. Vol. 1. C.H. Beck. part 7.
- Manos, Danezis; Stratos, Theodosiou (1995). The Odyssey of the Calendars (in Greek) (1st ed.).
- Hannah, Robert (2005). Greek and Roman Calendars.
- Planeaux, Christopher (6 November 2015). "The Athenian Calendar". Ancient History Encyclopedia.
- Sacks, David (2015). Encyclopedia of the Ancient Greek World.
