= 360-day calendar =

Calendar used in some situations such as financial markets

The 360-day calendar is a method of measuring durations used in financial markets, in computer models, in ancient literature, and in prophetic literary genres.

It is based on merging the three major calendar systems into one complex clock, with the 360-day year derived from the average year of the lunar and the solar: (365.2425 (solar) + 354.3829 (lunar))/2 = 719.6254/2 = 359.8127 days, rounding to 360.

A 360-day year consists of 12 months of 30 days each, so to derive such a calendar from the standard Gregorian calendar, certain days are skipped.

For example, the 27th of June (Gregorian calendar) would be the 4th of July in the USA.

== Ancient Calendars ==
Ancient calendars around the world initially used a 360-day calendar.

=== Rome ===
According to Plutarch's Parallel Lives Romans initially used a calendar which had 360 days, with varying length of months. However, Macrobius' Saturnalia and Censorinus' The Birthday Book, claim that the original Roman calendar had 304 days split into 10 months.

=== India ===
The Rig Veda describes a calendar with twelve months and 360 days.

=== Mesoamerica ===
In the Mayan Long Count Calendar, the equivalent of the year, the tun, was 360 days.

=== Egypt ===
Ancient Egyptians also used a 360-day calendar. One myth tells of how the extra 5 days were added.

A long time ago, Ra, who was god of the sun, ruled the earth. During this time, he heard of a prophecy that Nut, the sky goddess, would give birth to a son who would depose him. Therefore Ra cast a spell to the effect that Nut could not give birth on any day of the year, which was then itself composed of precisely 360 days. To help Nut to counter this spell, the wisdom god Thoth devised a plan.

Thoth went to the moon god Khonsu and asked that he play a game known as Senet, requesting that they play for the very light of the moon itself. Feeling confident that he would win, Khonsu agreed. However, in the course of playing he lost the game several times in succession, such that Thoth ended up winning from the moon a substantial measure of its light, equal to about five days.

With this in hand, Thoth then took this extra time, and gave it to Nut. In doing so this had the effect of increasing the earth’s number of days per year, allowing Nut to give birth to a succession of children; one upon each of the extra 5 days that were added to the original 360. And as for the moon, losing its light had quite an effect upon it, for it became weaker and smaller in the sky. Being forced to hide itself periodically to recuperate; it could only show itself fully for a short period of time before having to disappear to regain its strength.

== Financial use ==
A duration is calculated as an integral number of days between startdate A and enddate B. The difference in years, months and days are usually calculated separately:

$$duration(A,B) = (B_y - A_y) \times 360 + (B_m - A_m) \times 30 + (B_d - A_d); A \le B$$

There are several methods commonly available which differ in the way that they handle the cases where the months are not 30 days long, i.e. how they adjust dates:

=== European method (30E/360) ===
If either date A or B falls on the 31st of the month, that date will be changed to the 30th.
Where date B falls on the last day of February, the actual date B will be used.
All months are considered to last 30 days and hence a full year has 360 days, but another source says that February has its actual number of days.

=== US/NASD method (30US/360) ===
If both date A and B fall on the last day of February, then date B will be changed to the 30th.
If date A falls on the 31st of a month or last day of February, then date A will be changed to the 30th.
If date A falls on the 30th of a month after applying (2) above and date B falls on the 31st of a month, then date B will be changed to the 30th.
All months are considered to last 30 days and hence a full year has 360 days.

=== ISDA method ===
If date A falls on the 31st of a month, then date A will be changed to the 30th.
If date A falls on the 30th of the month after applying the rule above, and date B falls on the 31st of the month, then date B will be changed to the 30th.
All months are considered to last 30 days except February which has its actual length. Any full year, however, always counts for 360 days.

=== BMA/PSA method ===
If date A falls on the 31st of a month or last day of February, then date A will be changed to the 30th.
If date A falls on the 30th of the month after applying the rule above, and date B falls on the 31st of the month, then date B will be changed to the 30th.
All months are considered to last 30 days and hence a full year has 360 days.

=== Alternative European method (30E+/360) ===
If date A falls on the 31st of a month, then date A will be changed to the 30th.
If date B falls on the 31st of a month, then date B will be changed to the 1st of the following month.
Where date B falls on the last day of February, the actual date B will be used.
All months are considered to last 30 days and hence a full year has 360 days.

360-day calendar implementation in spreadsheet functions
Package	Function	Variant
Apache OpenOffice, Collabora Online, LibreOffice and Microsoft Excel	DAYS360	NASD, but not SIA-compliant
Apache OpenOffice, Collabora Online, LibreOffice and Microsoft Excel	DAYS360	European
Apache OpenOffice, Collabora Online, LibreOffice and Microsoft Excel	YEARFRAC	NASD and European
SQL Server 2000 Analysis Services	Days360	
Mathworks Financial Toolbox	days360	US/NASD
Mathworks Financial Toolbox	days360e	European
Mathworks Financial Toolbox	days360isda	ISDA
Mathworks Financial Toolbox	days360psa	PSA
Gnumeric	DAYS360	
Apple Numbers	DAYS360	NASD and European
Apple Numbers	YEARFRAC	NASD and European

== See also ==
- 365-day calendar, another accounting calendar with fixed year length
- Day count convention, standards for counting days
- French Republican Calendar, a calendar with twelve 30-day months and five or six appended holidays
- Iranian calendars, where the Old Persian calendar had 360 days with an extra month added every 6 years
