= Rapa Nui calendar =

Lunisolar calendar of Easter Island

Rapanui Man in the Moon

The Rapa Nui calendar was the indigenous lunisolar calendar of Easter Island. It is now obsolete.

== Attestation ==
William J. Thomson, paymaster on the USS Mohican, spent twelve days on Easter Island from December 19 to 30, 1886. Among the data Thomson collected were the names of the nights of the lunar month and of the months of the year:

The natives reckoned their time, and in fact do so still by moons or months, commencing the year with August, which was, according to the traditions, the time when Hotu-Matua and his followers landed upon the island.

== Months ==
Thomson recorded the months as follows:

Rapanui name	Meaning	Western equivalent, 1886–1887
Anekena		August
Hora-iti	little summer	September
Hora-nui	big summer	October
Tangarouri		part of November
Kotuti		November and December
Ruti		December and January
Koro		January
Tuaharo		February
Tetuupu		March
Tarahao		April
Vaitu-nui	big winter	May
Vaitu-poto	short winter	June
Maro or Temaro		July

== Days ==
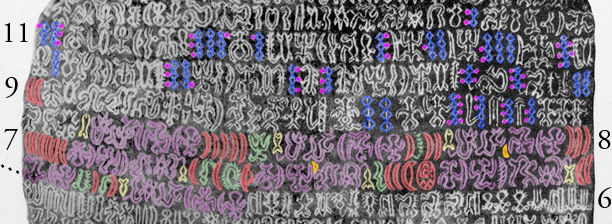
The Mamari Tablet of rongorongo is thought to include the Rapanui calendar. The identified calendrical information starts midway through recto line 6 (bottom center, upside down) and continues to the start of line 9 (top left). Two glyphs completing the purple sequence (ellipsis) are not visible at the start of 7. Blue and pink beaded lozenges ("accounting sets") follow the identified calendar, but their function is unknown.

The month was divided in two, beginning with the new and full moon. Thomson recorded the calendar at the time of his visit to the island as follows. The new moon occurred on November 25 and again on the night of December 24; Thompson records the crescent was first visible on November 26.

Rapanui name	Meaning	Western equivalent, 1886
Kokore tahi	first kokore	November 27
Kokore rua	second kokore	November 28
Kokore toru	third kokore	November 29
Kokore hâ	fourth kokore	November 30
Kokore rima	fifth kokore	December 1
Kokore ono	sixth kokore	December 2
Maharu	first quarter	December 3
Ohua		December 4
Otua		December 5
Ohotu		December 6
Maure		December 7
Ina-ira		December 8
Rakau		December 9
Omotohi	full moon	December 10
Kokore tahi	first kokore	December 11
Kokore rua	second kokore	December 12
Kokore toru	third kokore	December 13
Kokore hâ	fourth kokore	December 14
Kokore rima	fifth kokore	December 15
Tapume		December 16
Matua		December 17
Orongo	first quarter [sic]	December 18
Orongo taane		December 19
Mauri nui		December 20
Marui [sic] kero		December 21
Omutu		December 22
Tueo		December 23
Oata	new moon	December 24
Oari		December 25
Kokore tahi	first kokore	December 26

Three sources correspond with each other except for two intercalary days (in bold), and the night of the new moon in Englert, which seems to have been confused with one of these. Beginning with (o)ata, the night of the new moon, they are:

day	Englert	Thomson	Métraux	day	Englert	Thomson	Métraux
*1	oata	oata	ata	*15	omotohi	omotohi	motohi
2	**ohiro**	oari	ari	16	kokore tahi	kokore tahi	kokore tahi
3	kokore tahi	kokore tahi	kokore tahi	17	kokore rua	kokore rua	kokore rua
4	kokore rua	kokore rua	kokore rua	18	kokore toru	kokore toru	kokore toru
5	kokore toru	kokore toru	kokore toru	19	kokore hâ	kokore ha	kokore ha
6	kokore hâ	kokore ha	kokore ha	20	kokore rima	kokore rima	kokore rima
7	kokore rima	kokore rima	kokore rima	21	tapume	tapume	tapume
8	kokore ono	kokore ono	kokore ono	22	matua	matua	matua
*9	maharu	maharu	maharu	*23	orongo	orongo	rongo
10	ohua	ohua	hua	24	orongo taane	orongo tane	rongo tane
11	otua	otua	atua	25	mauri nui	mauri nui	mauri nui
x	—	ohotu	hotu	26	mauri karo	mauri kero	mauri kero
12	maure	maure	maure	27	omutu	omutu	mutu
13	ina-ira	ina-ira	ina-ira	28	tireo	tireo	tireo
14	rakau	rakau	rakau	x	—	—	hiro

*New moon, full moon, and first and last quarters.

The kokore are unnamed (though numbered) nights; tahi, rua, toru, haa, rima, ono are the numerals 1–6. The word kokore is cognate with Hawaiian ‘a‘ole "no" and Maori kahore "no" and Tahitian ‘aore "there is/are not"; here it may mean "without [a name], nameless". The word kokore is cognate in other Polynesian calendars such as the series of nights called korekore in the calendars found in New Zealand.

== Analysis ==
The calendar collected by Thomson is notable in that it contains thirteen months. All other authors mention only twelve, and Métraux and Barthel find fault with Thomson:

Thomson translates Anakena as August and suggests that the year began at that time because Hotu-Matua landed at Anakena in that month, but my informants and Roussel (1869) give Anakena as July.

We are basing the substitution on the lists by Metraux and Englert (ME:51; HM:310), which are in agreement. Thomson's list is off by one month.

However, Guy calculated the dates of the new moon for years 1885 to 1887 and showed that Thomson's list fit the phases of the moon for 1886. He concluded that the ancient Rapanui used a lunisolar calendar with kotuti its embolismic month (AKA "leap month"), and that Thomson chanced to land on Easter Island in a year with a leap month.

The days hotu and hiro appear to be intercalary. A 28-day calendar month needs one to two intercalary days to keep in phase with the 29½-day lunar month. One of the rongorongo tablets may describe a rule for when to add these days.
