= Mizo calendar =

Traditional calendar of the Mizo people

The Mizo calendar is a traditional lunisolar calendar utilized by the Mizo people of northeast India. This calendar comprises 12 months, each closely associated with the cultural, agricultural, and spiritual practices of the Mizo people.

Traditionally, the Mizo people observed the moon's phases. They counted approximately 14 days from the moon's first appearance in the sky to its full moon phase. Similarly, they believed it took another 14 days for the moon to fade completely after the full moon stage. The 15th night, when the moon neither fully waxed nor waned, was considered unique and not part of either phase. Based on these calculations, each lunar month was determined to be 29 days long.

== Months ==
Mizo	Relation to climate/agriculture/environment/festival	Main activities	Gregorian-Roman equivalents
Pawlkût thla	Agriculture/festival season	Celebration of the New Year.	January
Ramtuk thla	Agriculture/dry month	Selection of new jhum plots and preparation by cutting down trees.	February
Vau thla	Flower and fruit	New flowers, particularly Vaube (Bauhinia variegata), bloom; burning of dried slash from cleared trees.	March
Ṭau thla	Flower and Fruit	Ripening of local berries like Hmutau (Rubus ellipticus).	April
Ṭomir thla	Weather and Climate	Beginning of the monsoon season; sowing seeds.	May
Nikir thla	Weather and Climate	The sun begins its southward journey; cultivation in jhum fields.	June
Vawkhniahzawn thla	Weather and Climate	Peak rainfall season.	July
Thitin thla	Spiritual/Sacred season	Period of solemnity; marriage and merrymaking are forbidden.	August
Mimkût thla	Agriculture/festival	Harvesting corn	September
Khuangchawi thla	Agriculture/festival	Festive season with the brightest moonlight.	October
Sahmulphah thla	Weather and Climate	Onset of the winter season.	November
Pawltlak thla	Agriculture	End of the agricultural year; harvesting rice.	December

== Summer solstice ==
The Mizo people identified the 21st day of the Nikir month as the longest day of the year, known in modern terms as the summer solstice. They referred to this day as Lalmanga Nu Lawmrawih Ni—a name rooted in an enduring local folktale. The term Nikir translates to "returning of the sun."

According to tradition, a widow called Lalmanga Nu (lit. 'mother of Lalmanga') recognised the significance of this day and annually encouraged her friends to work in her jhum fields on the 21st day of Nikir to maximize labour input during the longest day. After Lalmanga Nu Lawmrawih Ni, the Mizo believed that the sun began its "return," causing days to grow progressively shorter.

== Key dates ==
- Chapchar Kut – first Friday of Vau thla.
