= Florentine calendar =

Medieval system of dates in Florence

The Florentine calendar, also referred to as the stylus Florentinus ("Florentine style"), was the calendar used in the Republic of Florence in Italy during the Middle Ages. Unusually, both the beginning of the day and the beginning of the year differed from the traditional Julian calendar.

== Beginning of the day ==
The Florentine day began at sunset and ended at the following sunset, such that the whole day was shifted forwards by (up to) several hours when compared to the modern day (running from midnight to midnight). As such, a reference to an event at "two hours into the day" meant two hours after sunset, and occurred on the previous day by modern reckoning. By way of example, 10 August in the Florentine calendar covers the period from sunset on 9 August in the modern calendar until sunset on 10 August. Conversely, 10 August in the modern calendar runs from midnight (several hours into the day) on 10 August in the Florentine calendar until midnight on 11 August.

== Beginning of the year ==
The Florentine year began on 25 March, and not on 1 January, with the apparent year lagging behind the traditional Julian calendar. Thus, 31 December 1200 was followed by 1 January 1200 (not 1201, as it would become in the Julian calendar), and the year remained the same until 24 March 1200. This was then followed by 25 March 1201, the day on which the two calendars synchronised. This is the reason that some dates have an apparent discrepancy of one year. For example, a birth date of 10 March 1552 in Florentine reckoning translates to 10 March 1553 in the Julian calendar, setting aside any discrepancy due to the differing start of the day.

Beginning the year on a date other than 1 January was common during the mediaeval period. The first day of the year falling on 25 March meant that the Florentine calendar was in the stile dell'Annunciazione ("style of the Annunciation") or stile dell'Incarnazione ("style of the Incarnation") - also styled in Latin as ab [Dominica] incarnatione ("from the [Lord's] Incarnation") - by reference to the Solemnity of the Annunciation, which also saw use in the Sienese, English and Scottish calendars. The Pisan calendar, as well as those of Cortona and Pistoia, were also in this style, but confusingly ran ahead of the Julian calendar rather than behind, resulting in them lying exactly one year ahead of the Florentine calendar. By contrast, calendars in the stile della Natività ("style of the Nativity") as in Arezzo, Assisi and Perugia began on the Solemnity of the Nativity of the Lord (Christmas) on 25 December, the Venetian calendar began on 1 March until the Fall of the Venetian Republic, and the French year on Easter day until 1564. The traditional Julian calendar was sometimes said to be in the stile della Circoncisione ("style of the Circumcision"). See beginning of the year.

== End of use ==
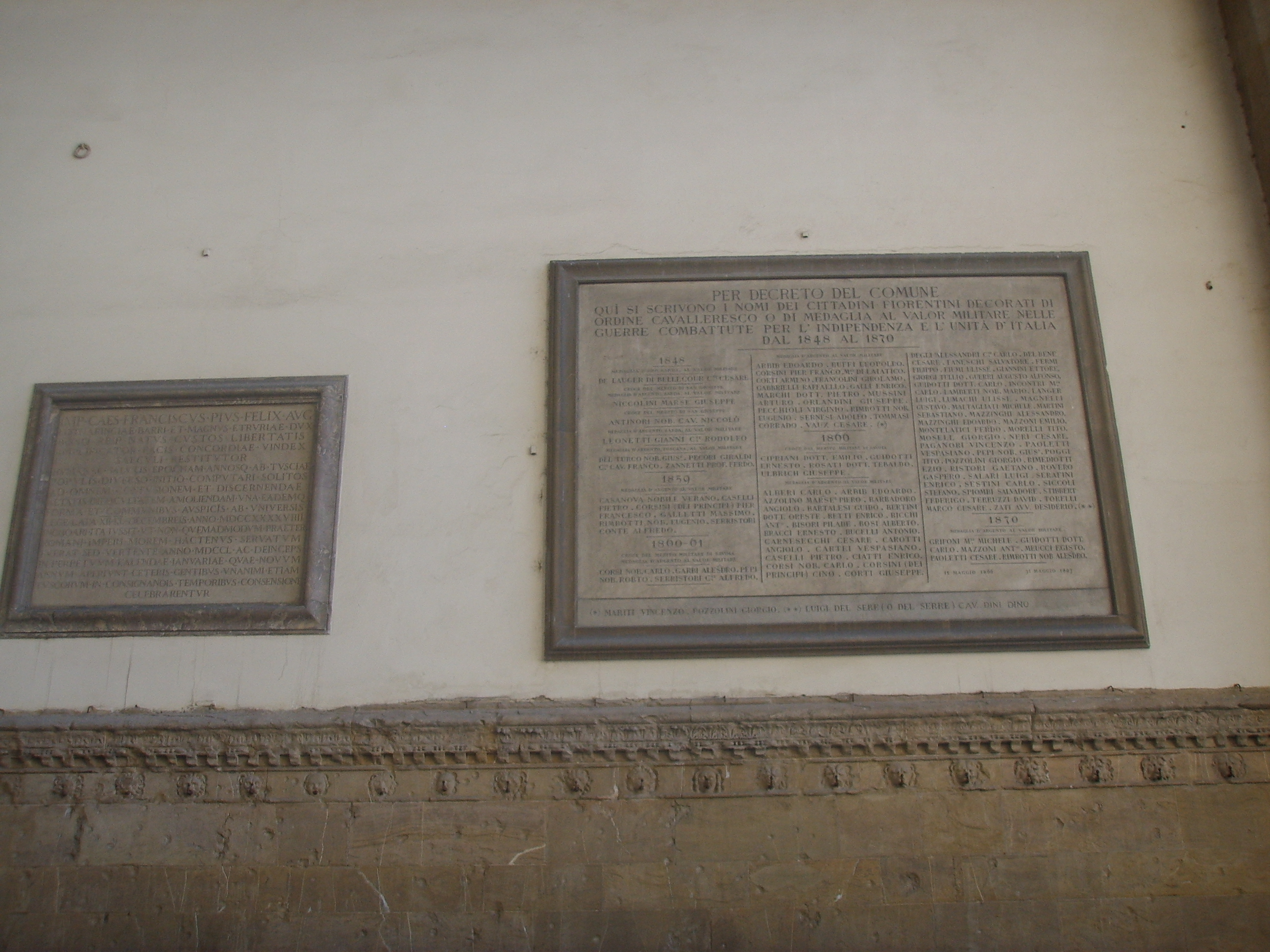
The 1750 plaque on the Loggia wall on the left. Another 1893 plaque on the right commemorates the Florentines distinguished in war.

Italy was one of the few regions to immediately convert from the Julian calendar to the Gregorian: 4 October 1582 was followed by 15 October 1582, the latter being the first day of the new Gregorian calendar. Not until 1749, however, were the ancient calendars definitively outlawed in Tuscany: in that year the recently appointed Grand Duke and Holy Roman Emperor, Francis I, ordered that, starting from 1750, the first of January should become the first day of the year, thus having the "peoples of Tuscia" conform to all the others. A plaque in Latin commemorating the grand ducal/imperial decree is affixed to the west wall of the Loggia dei Lanzi, in Piazza della Signoria. (Note: The plaque is reproduced online and translated into Italian at the "FlorencewithGuide" website (Silvia Bonacini, Il calendario fiorentino). Two similar plaques are affixed in Pisa and Siena.)

== See also ==
- Pisan calendar
- Roman calendar
- More veneto
- Time in Italy
