= Qumran calendrical texts =

Texts from Qumran

Qumran calendrical texts refers to some of the Dead Sea Scrolls from Qumran that contain references to calendars and timekeeping. These texts include the mishmarot, which were the rosters of weekly shifts or courses for Temple service. In addition to the mishmarot, there are also other calendrical texts, for example those concerned with the yearly festivals, such as found in the Temple Scroll, and the liturgical texts with calendrical structures.

Among Qumran texts, there are documents from different periods of time. While most of the texts are in Hebrew, there are also Aramaic documents. Thus several different calendars are attested in Qumran. The most common calendar found is what has often been described in initial publications as a solar calendar. Yet further research showed that the picture is more complicated, and the lunar phases also play an important role in several Qumran documents.

About twenty texts from Qumran deal with calendars, which reflects the great importance that the "proper chronology" played for the community that produced the scrolls.

== Qumran 364-day calendar ==
The main 364-day calendar found in Qumran has often been described as a ‘solar calendar’. However, several scholars like Philip Callaway and Uwe Glessmer have objected to this terminology, and instead stressed the schematic nature of this calendar. Indeed, the use of this 364-day calendar does not depend on the regular observation of the sun.

The main feature of this 364-day calendar seems to be the predominant importance of Sabbath-observance. This calendar makes sure that any other regular biblical holiday does not fall on the Sabbath, and does not interfere with its observance. That is why Feldman suggests the use of the term 'Sabbatarian calendar'.

"While many scholars have described this as a “solar” or “concordant” calendar because it mathematically synchronizes the rhythms of sun, moon, stars and Sabbath, I contend that this is best described ideologically as a Sabbatarian calendar because the Sabbath, observed by the weekly duty shifts of the priests in the Temple, is the central rhythm of time to which all others are subservient."

This calendar differs significantly from the Babylonian lunar calendar that evolved into the 354-day Hebrew calendar known today. The scrolls' 364-day calendar divided the year into four quarters and recorded the feast days of the community. In this Sabbatarian (or Sabbatical) calendar, the Feasts were always fixed on the same day of the month, and typically occurred on different days from those indicated in the Babylonian-based calendar.

Many of the Qumran texts featuring this calendar are contained in the rosters of weekly shifts or courses of temple service for the twenty-four priestly families, known as Mishmarot.

There is some ambiguity as to whether the four cardinal days were at the beginning of the month or the end. The clearest calendar attestations give a year of four seasons, each having three months of 30, 30, and 31 days, with the cardinal day the extra day at the end, for a total of 91 days or exactly 13 weeks. Each season started on Wednesday, the fourth day of the week (Hebrew: יוֹם רְבִיעִי, romanized: yom rəb̲iʿi), every year.

The writings often discuss the moon, but the calendar was not based on the moon's movement anymore than the indications of the moon's phases on a modern Western calendar indicate that that is a lunar calendar. A recent analysis of one of the last scrolls remaining to be deciphered has revealed it relates to this calendar. The sect used the word tekufah to identify each of the four special days, marking the transitions between the seasons.

Qumran 364-day calendar has also been described as the “Jubilees-Qumran” calendar, the term first suggested by Annie Jaubert (1953). Indeed, a very similar 364-day calendrical system is also found in the Book of Jubilees, which also puts a great stress on Sabbath-observance. Jaubert further argued that the “Jubilees-Qumran” calendar is well attested in the early books of the Old Testament. Specifically, she pointed out that the patriarchs always journeyed on Sunday, Wednesday and Friday only, and not on the Sabbath. Thus, this constitutes the pattern of Sabbath work avoidance both in the Bible and in the Book of Jubilees.

While the calendar contained in the Book of Enoch also shares some features with the Qumran 364-day calendar, the moon phases are much more important for the Book of Enoch. Also, the Sabbath-observance is not even mentioned in the Book of Enoch.

=== Structure ===
The 364-day year is made up of twelve months, grouped in quarters. Each quarter contains three months; two of 30 days and one of 31 days, i.e. 91 days or 13 weeks, each quarter. The following table shows a quarter of the year. (The day names are provided only to facilitate understanding. Other than the weekly Sabbath, the other days were merely numbered in the calendrical texts.)

	Months 1, 4, 7, 10					Months 2, 5, 8, 11					Months 3, 6, 9, 12
Day 4th	1	8	15	22	29		6	13	20	27		4	11	18	25
Day 5th	2	9	16	23	30		7	14	21	28		5	12	19	26
Day 6th	3	10	17	24		1	8	15	22	29		6	13	20	27
Sabbath	4	11	18	25		2	9	16	23	30		7	14	21	28
Day 1st	5	12	19	26		3	10	17	24		1	8	15	22	29
Day 2nd	6	13	20	27		4	11	18	25		2	9	16	23	30
Day 3rd	7	14	21	28		5	12	19	26		3	10	17	24	31

The year and each of its quarters starts on the same day, the fourth day of the week (Wednesday to us). This was the day when the sun was created in Genesis 1:14–18.

However, the calendar as we know it is 364 days long, making it one and a quarter days short of a true year. This means, if it were put into practice, it would quickly lose synchronisation with astronomical events. Because of this, Lawrence Schiffman has stated the view that "this calendar was never really put to the test except perhaps for a short period". Uwe Glessmer has proposed on the basis of 4Q319 ("Otot") that the calendar was in fact intercalated, a week being added every seven years to keep it synchronised with the solar year. Roger Beckwith suggested that the discrepancy between the calendar and the true year, though noticed, may not have been of concern to the community that used the calendar.

== Pentecontad calendar ==
Another calendar attested at Qumran is the Pentecontad calendar. In this calendar, each fifty-day period was made up of seven weeks of seven days and seven Sabbaths, with an extra fiftieth day, known as the atzeret (meaning "stopping" or "ceasing" in Hebrew). This calendar is built upon “sevens”; the number seven played a big role. Accordingly, seven pentecontad cycles also constitute a year. Further, seven years constitute a sabbatical cycle, and seven of those constitute a jubilee.

According to Stephen Pfann, the group of Qumran texts related to this calendar includes,

"... the Book of Jubilees, 4Q324d–h (Cryptic A) Festal Calendar, 4QMMT, the Temple Scroll, and 4Q365 RP. It typically contains at least 4 Pentecontad Feasts (PF), incorporated into the biblical festal scheme. It also characteristically lacks the biblical festival of Second Passover."

== Mishmarot ==
The Mishmarot are texts which outline the weekly courses of the twenty-four priestly families who perform duties in the temple. The order of families follows that found in 1 Chronicles 24:7–18. Repeating the twenty-four over a period of six years completes a full cycle and the following year once again starts with the first of the priestly families.

Here are a few entries in 4Q325 ("Mishmarot D"):

The beginning of the se[cond] month is [on the si]xth [day] of the course of Jedaiah. On the second of the month is the Sabbath of the course of Harim....

As the years are traversed, Sabbaths and feast days are usually noted. For example (from 4Q326):

[.. on the evening of the fourteenth day of the month] is the Feast of Unleavened Bread. On the fou[rth day of the week is a holy assembly. On the twenty-fifth of the month is] a Sabbath. On the twenty-sixth of the month is the B[arley] Festival....

The texts are quite fragmentary, but because so much of the material is formulaic, restoration is relatively easy.

One of these texts, the extremely fragmentary Mishmarot C (4Q322–324b), also contains a number of historical allusions, mentioning the names "Yohanan" (perhaps John Hyrcanus) and Shelamzion (Salome Alexandra). Illusive snippets of text read "Shelamzion entered..." and "Hyrcanus rebelled..." (presumably Hyrcanus II who rebelled against his brother Aristobulus II). Another fragment twice mentions "Amelios killed..." Aemilius Scaurus (one of Pompey's lieutenants in Judea in 63 BCE).

== Other texts ==
Among the calendrical works is 4Q317, which lists the phases of the moon with respect to the 364-day calendar, 4Q318 ("Brontologion"), which contains a section which used thunder (Ancient Greek: brontos) at various times to predict the future, and 4Q319 (Otot or "signs"), which analyzes certain events over a period of 294 years, i.e. six Jubilees.

=== Qumran disc ===
A small limestone disc was discovered at Qumran in 1954 during the excavations of Roland de Vaux, who cataloged it without much notice. This Qumran disc is about 14.5 cm (6 in) in diameter. The historical context of this discovery is believed to be during the Period lb or II of Qumran (ca. 103 BCE-68 CE). Much later, in the late 1990s, some scholars examined it closely, and identified it as a sundial.

The discovery of the sundial is significant because it provides material evidence of Qumran community’s interest in measuring time. This is consistent with the keen interest in calendars and time-keeping methods as seen in numerous Dead Sea Scrolls.

== See also ==
- Priestly divisions
- Pentecontad calendar

== Bibliography ==
- Jonathan Ben-Dov, Stéphane Saulnier 2008, Qumran Calendars: A Survey of Scholarship 1980-2007. Currents in Biblical Research. 2008; 7; 124. doi:10.1177/1476993X08094026 - academia.edu
- Uwe Glessmer, "Investigation of the Otot Text (4Q319) and Questions about Methodology", in Methods of Investigation Wise et al., pp. 429–440.
- Uwe Glessmer, "Calendars in the Qumran Scrolls", in The Dead Sea scrolls after fifty years, Peter W. Flint and James C. Vanderkam. eds., Vol. 2 (Leiden: Brill, 1999) ISBN 9004110615 pp. 213–278.
- Helen R. Jacobus. 'Zodiac Calendars in the Dead Sea Scrolls and Their Reception: Ancient astronomy and Astrology in Early Judaism.' Leiden: Brill, 2014. ISBN 9789004284050
- Lawrence Schiffman, Reclaiming the Dead Sea Scrolls (Philadelphia: Jewish Publication Society, 1994) ISBN 9780300140224.
- Sacha Stern, "Qumran Calendars: Theory and Practice", in The Dead Sea Scrolls: In Their Historical Context, Timothy Lim ed. (Edinburgh: T & T Clark, 2000) ISBN 056708759X pp. 179–186.
- Shemaryahu Talmon, "Calendars and Mishmarot", in Encyclopedia of the Dead Sea Scrolls, Lawrence H. Schiffman & James C. VanderKam eds., Vol. 1 (Oxford, 2000) ISBN 0195137965 pp. 108–117.
- James C. VanderKam, "Calendrical Texts and the Origins of the Dead Sea Scroll Community", in Methods of Investigation Wise et al., pp. 371–388.
- James C. VanderKam, Calendars in the Dead Sea Scrolls: Measuring Time (Routledge, 1998) ISBN 0415165148.
- Michael O. Wise, "An Annalistic Calendar from Qumran", in Methods of Investigation Wise et al., pp. 389–408.
- Michael Wise, Martin Abegg Jr., & Edward Cook, The Dead Sea Scrolls: A New Translation (HarperSanFrancisco, 1996) ISBN 0060692014 pp. 296–323.
- Michael O. Wise, Norman Golb, John J. Collins, and Dennis Pardee, Methods of Investigation of the Dead Sea Scrolls and the Khirbet Qumran Site (New York Academy of Sciences, 1994) ISBN 0897667948.
- Geza Vermes, "The Complete Dead Sea Scrolls in English" (The Penguin Press, 1997) ISBN 0-14-027807-9.
