= Pentecontad calendar =

Ancient western Mesopotamian calendar using 7 periods of 50 days

The pentecontad calendar (from Koine Greek: πεντηκοστή, romanized: pentēkostē, lit. 'fiftieth') is an agricultural calendar system thought to be of Amorite origin in which the year is broken down into seven periods of fifty days (a total of 350 days), with an annual supplement of fifteen or sixteen days. Identified and reconstructed by Julius and Hildegaard Lewy in the 1940s, the calendar's use dates back to at least the 3rd millennium BCE in western Mesopotamia and surrounding areas. Used well into the modern age, forms of it have been found in Nestorianism and the Ethiopian Jews and among the Fellahin of modern Palestine.

== Overview ==
In Akkadian, the pentecontad calendar was known as hamšâtum and the period of fifteen days at the end of the year was known to Babylonians as shappatum. The religious injunction to "observe the Sabbath" is thought to derive from the injunction to observe the shappatum, the period of harvest time at the end of each year in the pentecontad calendar system. Each fifty-day period was made up of seven weeks of seven days and seven Sabbaths, with an extra fiftieth day, known as the atzeret.

Used extensively by the various Canaanite tribes of Palestine, the calendar was also thought to have been used by the Israelites until the official adoption of a new type of solar calendar system by Solomon.

In The Odyssey (8th century BC), the sun-god Helios keeps 350 sheep and 350 cattle on his holy island, thought to be a reference to the pentecontad calendar.

Philo expressly connected the "unequalled virtues" of the pentecontad calendar with the Pythagorean theorem, further describing the number fifty as the "perfect expression of the right-angled triangle, the supreme principle of production in the world, and the 'holiest' of numbers".

The calendar was used among Ethiopian Jews for a millennium. Till modern times Shabbat festivals are still celebrated currently by the Beta Israel. According to this tradition: "The Sabbaths are divided into cycles of seven. A special prayer, is recited at sunset and reflects the particular characteristics of each Sabbath. The seventh Sabbath, the Legatä Sänbät, is the holiest of all, and there are extra prayers, festivities and a special sanctification service."

Tawfiq Canaan (1882–1964) described the use of such a calendar among Palestinians in Palestine, as did his contemporary Gustaf Dalman, who wrote of the practices of Muslim agriculturalists who used Christian designations for the fiftieth day, "which in turn overlaid far more ancient agricultural practices: grape-watching, grape-pressing, sowing, etc."

Stephan Hanna Stephan provides details about the structure of this calendar as it was being practiced in the early 20th century in an article in the journal of the Palestine Oriental Society entitled The Division of the Year in Palestine. He notes that the first period of fifty days begins on Easter (by the Julian calendar used by the Eastern Orthodox Church) and continues until Pentecost, and the harvesting of lentils. The second period immediately begins and coincides with the harvesting of wheat and barley and ends with the feast of Mar Elias (July 20). The third period coincides with the harvesting of grapes and figs and ends on Eid al-Saleeb (September 14). The fourth period sees the harvesting and pressing olives and covers a period of exactly 50 days (like the first) extending to November 3, which marks Eid al Ludd. The fifth marks a time of ploughing and sowing and extends until Christmas. The sixth ends when the lenten fast begins and the seventh period ends with Easter again. He also mentions another concomitant system of dividing the year into periods of 40 and 50 days.

Julian Morgenstern argued that the calendar of the Book of Jubilees has ancient origins as a somewhat modified survival of the pentecontad calendar.

== At Qumran ==
Several different calendars are reflected in the Qumran calendrical texts, some of which were used by the Essenes at Qumran. Their year was marked by festivals such as the Feast of New Wine, the Feast of Oil, and the Feast of New Wheat. But rather than a pentecontad calendar, with its fifty-day period, the Qumran texts mostly refer to a 364-day calendar tradition that divides the year into four quarters of three months each. Nevertheless, the pentecontad calendar is reflected in some Qumran texts such as the Temple Scroll (11Q19 13-29).

In the Temple Scroll's pentecontad calendar, the year was divided into seven fifty-day periods, each marked by an agricultural festival. The offering of firstfruits of the harvest at the Temple was connected with this.

Several other texts at Qumran have been found to contain pentecontad calendars. Among them are 11Q20 1–6, 4Q325, and 4Q365.

== Later research ==
The calendrical exposition by Lewy was widely adopted initially by many scholars. Yet it was challenged in the more recent research. Ben-Dov (2012) cast some doubt on the early attestations of such a pentecontad calendar.

Prominent Assyriologists like Benno Landsberger were quite skeptical, and even Julius Lewy did not support it later on.

While some biblical passages, such as Deut 16:9 and Lev 23:15–16 do give support to a pentecontad calendar by referring to a count of seven weeks during harvest time, these biblical sources do not reflect a full-fledged pentecontad calendar more generally.

The seven-fold based thinking is relatively common in the priestly sources of the Torah. According to Ben-Dov, pentecontad calendars were "the fruit of a later history of development", which emerged from such priestly and other sources. Thus, their real development occurred during the late Hellenistic or early Roman period.

Further development of pentecontad calendars occurred primarily in certain Jewish circles associated with apocalyptic traditions, as well as in the Pythagorean-minded circles influenced by Philonic thought. Later, these traditions also gained popularity in some Christian and Jewish communities.

== See also ==
- Thursday of the Dead
