= List of non-standard dates =

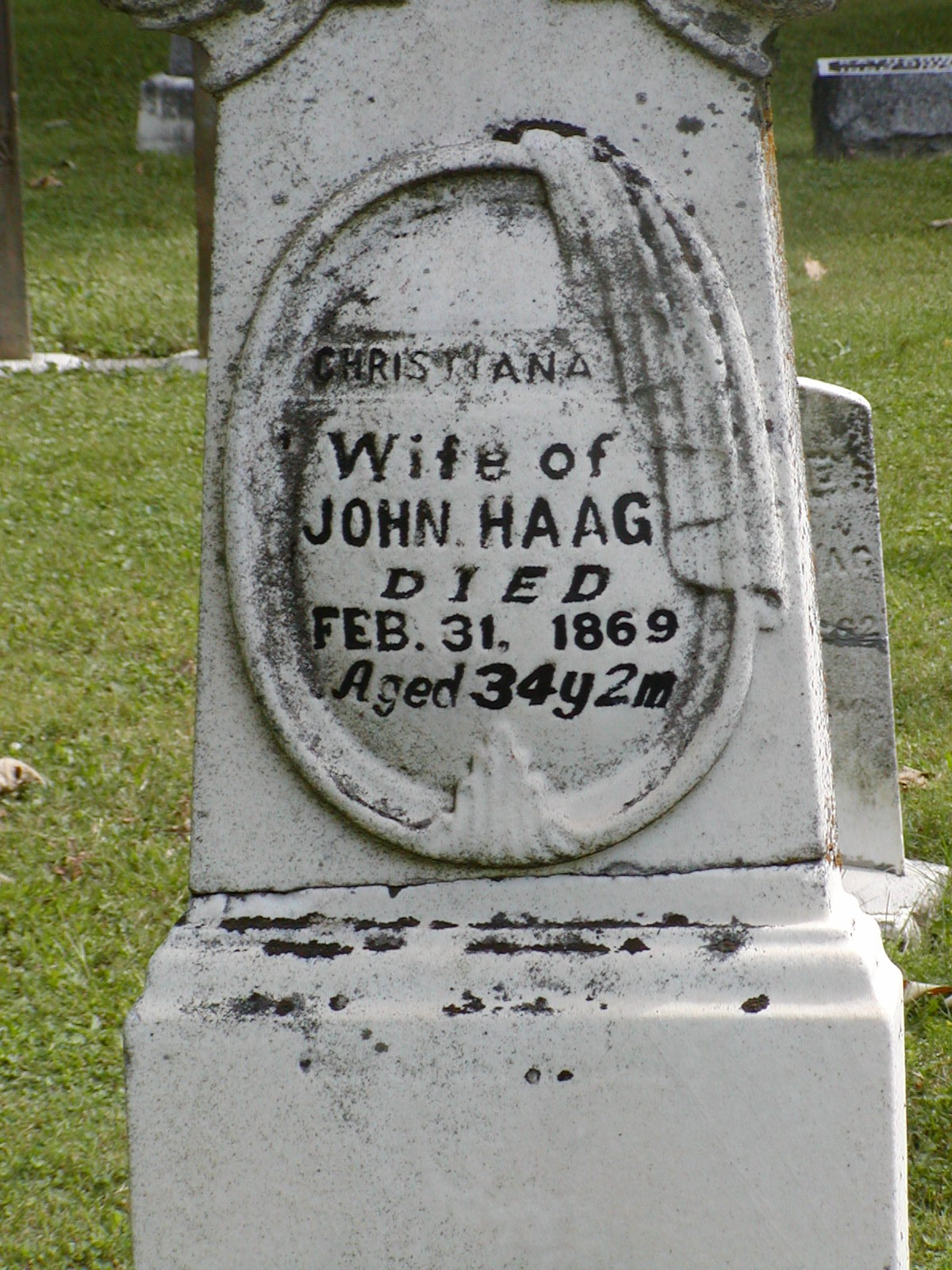
February 31 on a tombstone

Several non-standard dates are used in calendars for various purposes: some are expressly fictional, some are intended to produce a rhetorical effect (such as sarcasm), and others attempt to address a particular mathematical, scientific or accounting requirement or discrepancy within the calendar system.

== Historical ==
=== January 0 ===
January 0 is an alternative date for December 31. January 0 is the day before January 1 and after December 30 in an annual ephemeris. It keeps the date in the year for which the ephemeris was published, thus avoiding any reference to the previous year, even though it is the same day as December 31 of the previous year (Jan 0, 1900 is the same as Dec 31, 1899). January 0 also occurs in the epoch for the ephemeris second, "1900 January 0 at 12 hours ephemeris time". 1900 January 0 (at Greenwich Mean Noon) was also the epoch used by Newcomb's Tables of the Sun, which became the epoch for the Dublin Julian day.

=== February 29 ===
February 29 was a non-standard date until its adoption between the 15th and 17th centuries. Even afterward, it was not until the passage of the Calendar (New Style) Act 1750 that 29 February was formally recognised in British law. Before this change, February 24 was doubled in leap years in the Julian calendar.

=== February 30 ===
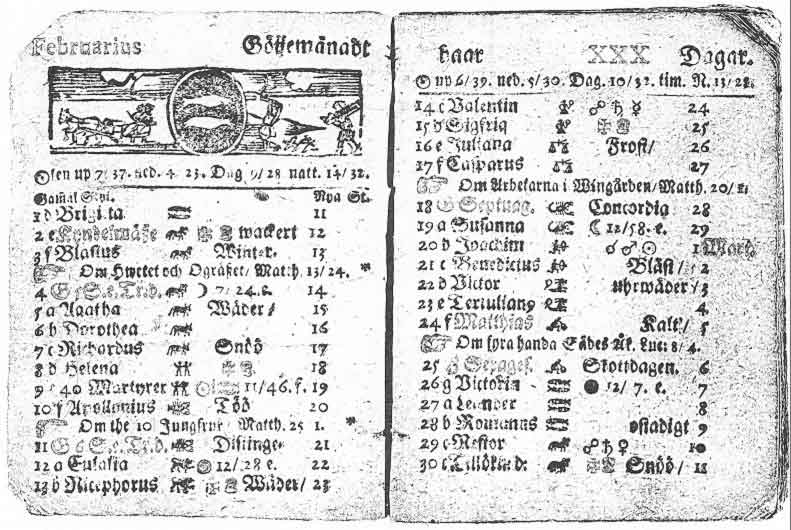
Swedish calendar for February 1712

February 30 is a day that does not occur on the Gregorian calendar, where the month of February contains only 28 days, or 29 days in a leap year. However, from a historical perspective February 30 has been used at least once, and it also appears in some reform calendars.

The thirteenth-century scholar Johannes de Sacrobosco claimed that in the Julian calendar, February had 30 days in leap years from 45 BC until 8 BC, when Augustus allegedly shortened February by one day to give that day to the month of August named after him so that it had the same length as the month of July named after his adoptive father, Julius Caesar. However, all historical evidence refutes Sacrobosco, including dual dates with the Alexandrian calendar.

February 30 was a day that happened in Sweden in 1712. This occurred because, instead of changing from the Julian calendar to the Gregorian calendar by omitting a block of consecutive days, as had been done in other countries, the Swedish Empire planned to change gradually by omitting all leap days from 1700 to 1740, inclusive, so that the next leap year after 1696 would not be until 1744. Although the leap day was omitted in February 1700, the Great Northern War had begun, diverting the attention of the Swedes from their calendar so that they did not omit leap days on the next two occasions; 1704 and 1708 remained leap years.

To avoid confusion and further mistakes, the Julian calendar was restored in 1712 by adding a second leap day, thus giving that year the only known actual use of February 30 in a calendar. That day corresponded to February 29 in the Julian calendar and to March 11 in the Gregorian calendar. The Swedish conversion to the Gregorian calendar was finally accomplished in 1753, when February 17 was followed by March 1.

Artificial calendars may also have 30 days in February. For example, in a climate model the statistics may be simplified by having 12 months of 30 days. The Hadley Centre General Circulation Model is an example.

=== May 35 ===
May 35 has been used to obliquely reference the Tiananmen Square protests, which ended on June 4, 1989. Chinese Internet authorities block mentions of June 4, and the non-standard date has been used to circumvent this censorship.

=== July 36 ===
July 36 refers to 5 August 2024, when the Bangladesh quota reform movement celebrated Prime Minister Sheikh Hasina resigning and fleeing to India after mass protests, which began with the reinstatement of the quota system in June and escalated despite the Supreme Court's ruling on 21 July in favor of quota reform.

=== December 31.5 GMT ===
December 31.5 GMT in 1924 almanacs was an instant defined to resolve the contrast between two different conventions in defining the civil time of referring to midnight as zero hours.

=== December 32 ===
The LearAvia Lear Fan aircraft test flight had British government funding that expired at the end of that year. After the cancellation of a planned test flight on December 31, 1980, due to technical issues, the first prototype made its maiden flight on January 1, 1981, but a sympathetic government official recorded the date as "December 32, 1980".

== Software ==
=== January 0 ===
Microsoft Excel displays the day before January 1, 1900 (the earliest date it can represent), as January 0, 1900. It also treats 1900 incorrectly as a leap year (whereas only centuries divisible by 400 are), so it displays the day before March 1, 1900, as the non-existent February 29 instead of February 28. This means that March 1, 1900, is the earliest date that can be used reliably in Excel.

=== February 31 ===
February 31, 32, and 33 were used to calculate weather data by making each month the same length.

=== August 32 ===
The video game Boku no Natsuyasumi had a glitch wherein after certain inputs are made, the player could advance past the thirty-one in-game days of gameplay to "August 32nd" and beyond. As no story events were programmed for these days, the game became increasingly unstable with various gameplay and visual bugs, and the glitch gained a degree of infamy as a Japanese internet meme.

=== Other non-standard dates ===
Other non-standard dates are sometimes used in software engineering. For example, Java (specifically the java.util.Calendar class) allows dates such as February 0 (= January 31) and April 31 (= May 1).

== Other uses ==
=== February 31 ===
February 31 or 31 February has been used in one case involving the grave of an alleged witch. As she "vowed" to return on the anniversary of her death a non-existent date was used. As no detailed records exist regarding this woman's life, the date could have also been made in error.

=== March 0 ===
March 0 or 0 March is used in astronomy. A fictitious or virtual date used primarily in computer programming, astronomical ephemerides, and the Doomsday algorithm. In these contexts, it simply refers to the last day of February.

=== 0th month, 0th day (00/00) ===
In some jurisdictions, when a person's birthdate is unknown with any more certainty than the year, documents will be issued with zeroes in the fields for month and day (e.g. 00-00-1999).

== Fictional calendars ==
In the works of J. R. R. Tolkien, the Hobbits have developed the Shire Reckoning. According to Appendix D of The Lord of the Rings, this calendar has arranged the year into 12 months of 30 days each. The month the Hobbits call Solmath is rendered in the text as February, and therefore the date February 30 exists in the narrative.

February 30, 1951, is the last night of the world in Ray Bradbury's short story "Last Night of the World".

June 31 is a fictional date in the Soviet film 31 June. It is also the date of a fictional RAF raid on Germany in Len Deighton's 1970 novel Bomber.

December 32 or 32 December is the date of Hogswatchnight in Hogfather by Terry Pratchett. It has also been used as a title for various works.

The children's book Please Try to Remember the First of Octember! by Dr. Seuss narrates many delightful things which are supposed to happen starting on the first day of the fictional month of Octember, not to be confused with October.

== In popular culture ==
30. Február is the title of a song by the Slovak rock band Iné Kafe on their album Je Tu Niekto?.

March 0 is used in Doomsday algorithm calculations. March 2 was celebrated as February 30 by Lin-Manuel Miranda and Weird Al Yankovic for the release date of Yankovic's "The Hamilton Polka".

May 35 is used in the title of The 35th of May, or Conrad's Ride to the South Seas, a German children's novel published in 1932.

In November 2010, it was discovered that a Hanshin Tigers wall calendar incorrectly included the date November 31. Fans who had bought the calendar were given a sticker to cover up the date, and reprinted calendars were sent.

The 1998 French-language film August 32nd on Earth was written and directed by Denis Villeneuve, and was his feature film directorial debut.

In the episode "94 Meetings" of the sitcom Parks and Recreation, Ron Swanson is forced to deal with 94 meetings in a single day because his assistant, April Ludgate, scheduled them all for March 31 instead of the common fake date of February 31, mistakenly believing it was not a real date.

== Reform calendars ==
Because evening out the lengths of the months is part of the rationale for reforming the calendar, some reform calendars, such as the World Calendar and the Hanke–Henry Permanent Calendar, contain a 30-day February. The Symmetry454 calendar assigns 35 days to February, May, August, and November, as well as December in a leap year.

== See also ==
- Ides of March
- List of calendars
- List of idioms of improbability, including various nonexistent dates
- Time formatting and storage bugs
- System time
- Tibb's Eve, a day said to occur neither before nor after Christmas
- Undecimber
