= Undecimber =

13th month

Undecimber or Undecember is a name for a thirteenth month in a calendar that normally has twelve months.

== Etymology ==
The word undecimber is based on the Latin word undecim meaning "eleven". It is formed in analogy with December, which, though the twelfth month in the Gregorian calendar, derives from decem meaning "ten". The Oxford Latin Dictionary defines it as "a humorous name given to the month following December".

== Roman use ==
Some modern authors, including the World Calendar Association and Isaac Asimov have reported the names "Undecember" and "Duodecember" for the two intercalary months inserted between November and December upon the adoption of the Julian calendar in 44 BC. This claim has no contemporary evidence; Cicero refers to the months as "intercalates prior and intercalates posterior" in his letters.

Historian Cassius Dio tells that Licinus, procurator of Gaul, added two months to the year 15 BC, because taxes were paid by the month. Dio, who wrote in Greek, says Licinus "called [the added months] the eleventh and the twelfth"; August Immanuel Bekker suggested the Latin names might have been "Undecember" and "Duodecember". The abbreviation Unde appears in a Roman inscription from Vercellae in Cisalpine Gaul, dating between the first century BC and the first century AD.

== Computing ==
In the Java Platform, Standard Edition, the java.util.Calendar class includes support for calendars which permit thirteen months. Although the Gregorian calendar used in most parts of the world includes only twelve months, there exist some lunar calendars that are divided into synodic months, with an intercalary or "leap" month added in some years. For example, in the Hebrew calendar seven years out of every nineteen (37%) have the "embolismic month" Adar I. The constant java.util.Calendar.UNDECIMBER represents such a month.

== Accounting ==
In accounting, a thirteenth month is sometimes used to adjust financial statements for an entire year without affecting monthly results. For example, an organization may wish to adjust its books to reflect the fact that some of its sales and resulting payments due from customers will not be paid. If an organization only does this once per year the organization can attribute these adjustments to "Month 13" so as not to inaccurately post a full year's worth of write offs to one month.

== See also ==
- 4–4–5 calendar
- Accounting period
- December 32
- February 29
- List of non-standard dates
- Mercedonius
- Ophiuchus (astrology)
