= Macedonian calendar =

Macedonian calendar may refer to:

- Ancient Macedonian calendar
- Modern Macedonian months
