= Julian calendar =

Solar calendar

Today (at UTC+00)
- Thursday, 29 October 2026
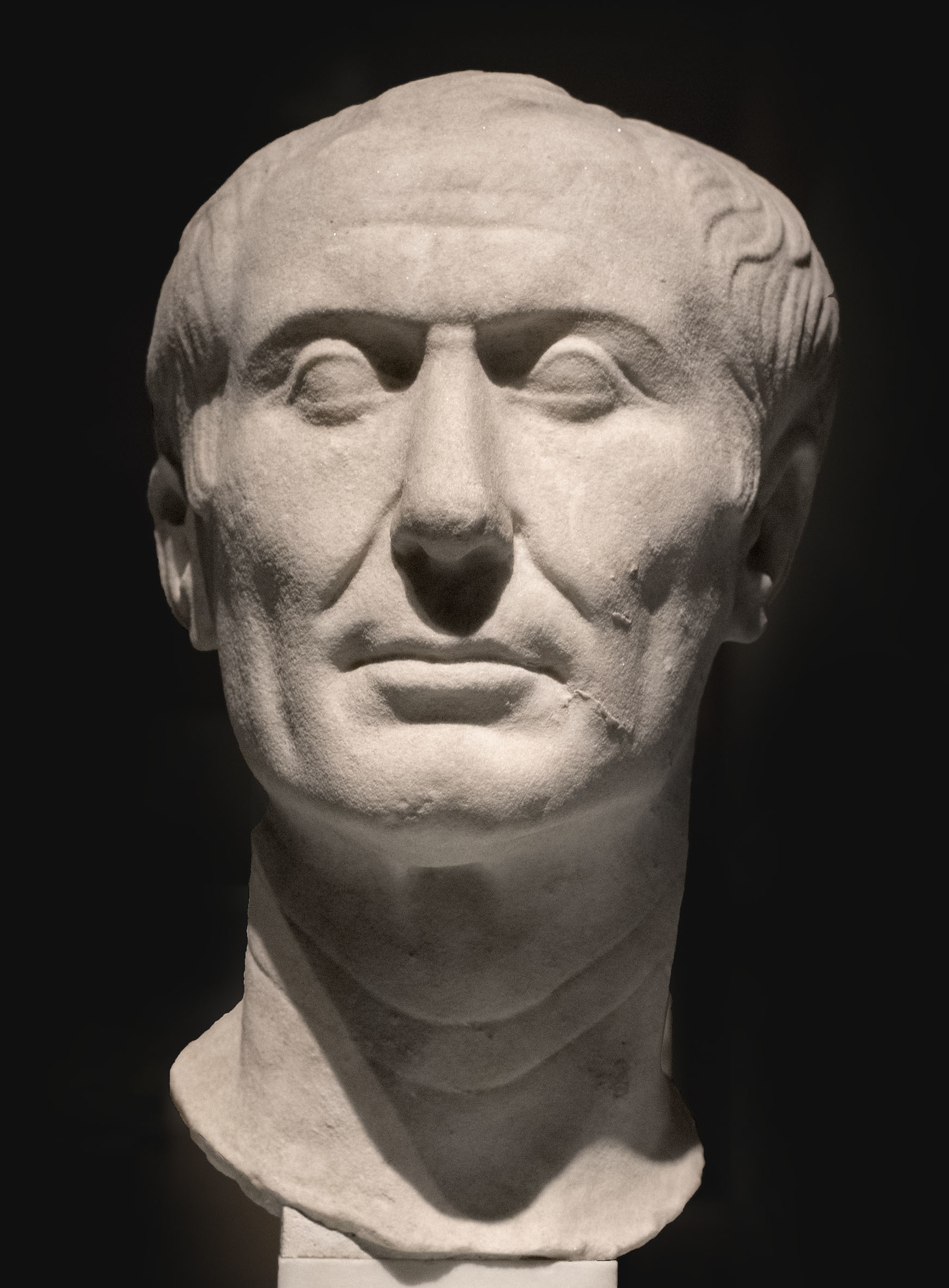
- The Tusculum portrait of Julius Caesar
- Julian: 16 October, AD 2026 (AM 7535)
Other calendars
Akan	Kuruyaw
Armenian	11 Trē 1476
Aztec	Atlcahualo 7, 7 Xōchitl
Babylonian	16 Tashritu, 2337 SE
Balinese pawukon	Menga, Pasah, Laba, Wage, Paniron, Wraspati of Watugunung, Brahma, Urungan, Suka
Bengali	13 Kartik, BS 1433
Chinese	Yang Fire Rat・Legs Mansion; Fire Horse Year, Month 9, Day 20 (Shuangjiang, 9 days until Lidong)
Common Era	29 October 2026 CE
Coptic	19 Paopi, AM 1743
Egyptian	16 Phamenoth, 2775 NE
Ethiopian	19 Ṭeqemt, 2019 Amätä Məhrät
French Republican	Décade I, Septidi de Brumaire de l'Année 235 de la République
Gregorian	29 October, AD 2026
Hebrew	18 Cheshvan, AM 5787
Hindu	Rohiṇi・Varīyas; Solar: 12 Kārtika, 1948 SE; Lunisolar: Caturthī, Kṛishna pakṣa of Āśvina, 2083 VE; Rāudra・5127 KY・1,872,877
Icelandic	Fimmtudagur, 6 Gormánuður 2026
Islamic	17 Jumada al-awwal, AH 1448 (using tabular method)
ISO week date	2026-W44-4
Japanese	19 Nagatsuki, Reiwa 8 (Sōkō, 9 days until Rittō)
Julian day	2461343
Korean	19 Gaedal, 4359 DE
Maya	13.0.14.1.0; 13 Zac, 7 Ahau
Roman	ante diem XVII Kalendas Novembres, MMDCCLXXIX AUC
Solar Hijri	7 Aban, SH 1405
Tibetan	19 tha skar, me pho rta 2153 or 1772 or 1000

The Julian calendar is a solar calendar of 365 days in every year with an additional leap day every fourth year (without exception). The Julian calendar is still used as a religious calendar in parts of the Eastern Orthodox Church and in parts of Oriental Orthodoxy as well as in the Berber calendar. For a quick calculation, between 1901 and 2099 the much more common Gregorian date equals the Julian date plus 13 days (for instance Julian 1 January falls on Gregorian 14 January).

The Julian calendar was proposed in 46 BC by (and takes its name from) Julius Caesar, as a reform of the earlier Roman calendar, which was largely a lunisolar one. It took effect on 1 January 45 BC, by his edict. Caesar's calendar became the predominant calendar in the Roman Empire and subsequently most of the Western world for more than 1,600 years, until 1582 when Pope Gregory XIII promulgated a revised calendar. Ancient Romans typically designated years by the names of ruling consuls; the Anno Domini system of numbering years was not devised until 525, and became widespread in Europe in the eighth century.

The Julian calendar has two types of years: a normal year of 365 days and a leap year of 366 days. They follow a simple cycle of three normal years and one leap year, giving an average year that is 365.25 days long. That is more than the actual solar year value of approximately 365.2422 days (the current value, which varies), which means the Julian calendar gains one day every 128 years. In other words, the Julian calendar gains 3.1 days every 400 years.

Gregory's calendar reform modified the Julian rule by eliminating occasional leap days, to reduce the average length of the calendar year from 365.25 days to 365.2425 days and thus dramatically reducing the Julian calendar's drift against the solar year: the Gregorian calendar gains just 0.1 day over 400 years. Most Catholic countries adopted the new calendar immediately; Protestant countries did so slowly in the course of the following two centuries or so; most Orthodox countries retain the Julian calendar for religious purposes but adopted the Gregorian as their civil calendar in the early part of the twentieth century.

== Table of months ==
Months (Roman)	Lengths before 46 BC	Length in 46 BC	Lengths as of 45 BC	Months (English)
Ianuarius	29	29	31	January
Februarius	28 (in common years); In intercalary years: 23 if Intercalaris is variable 23–24 if Intercalaris is fixed	28	28 (leap years: 29)	February
Intercalaris (Mercedonius) (only in intercalary years)	27 (or possibly 27–28)	23	—	—
Martius	31	31	31	March
Aprilis	29	29	30	April
Maius	31	31	31	May
Iunius	29	29	30	June
Quintilis (Iulius)	31	31	31	July
Sextilis (Augustus)	29	29	31	August
September	29	29	30	September
October	31	31	31	October
2nd intercalary	—	33	—	—
3rd intercalary	—	34	—	—
November	29	29	30	November
December	29	29	31	December
Total	355 or 377–378	445	365–366	365–366

== History ==
=== Motivation ===
The ordinary year in the previous Roman calendar consisted of 12 months, for a total of 355 days. In addition, a 27- or 28-day intercalary month, the Mensis Intercalaris, was sometimes inserted between February and March. This intercalary month was formed by inserting 22 or 23 days after the first 23 days of February; the last five days of February, which counted down toward the start of March, became the last five days of Intercalaris. The net effect was to add 22 or 23 days to the year, forming an intercalary year of 377 or 378 days. Some say the mensis intercalaris always had 27 days and began on either the first or the second day after the Terminalia (23 February).

If managed correctly, this system could have allowed the Roman year to stay roughly aligned to a tropical year. However, since the pontifices were often politicians, and because a Roman magistrate's term of office corresponded with a calendar year, this power was prone to abuse: a pontifex could lengthen a year in which he or one of his political allies was in office, or refuse to lengthen one in which his opponents were in power.

Caesar's reform was intended to solve this problem permanently, by creating a calendar that remained aligned to the sun without any human intervention. This proved useful very soon after the new calendar came into effect. Varro used it in 37 BC to fix calendar dates for the start of the four seasons, which would have been impossible only 8 years earlier. A century later, when Pliny dated the winter solstice to 25 December because the sun entered the 8th degree of Capricorn on that date, this stability had become an ordinary fact of life.

=== Context of the Julian reform ===
Although the approximation of 365 1/4 days for the tropical year had been known for a long time, ancient solar calendars had used less precise periods, resulting in gradual misalignment of the calendar with the seasons.

The octaeteris, a cycle of eight lunar years popularised by Cleostratus (and also commonly attributed to Eudoxus) which was used in some early Greek calendars, notably in Athens, is 1.53 days longer than eight mean Julian years. The length of nineteen years in the cycle of Meton was 6,940 days, six hours longer than the mean Julian year. The mean Julian year was the basis of the 76-year cycle devised by Callippus (a student under Eudoxus) to improve the Metonic cycle.

In Persia (Iran) after the reform in the old Persian calendar by introduction of the Persian Zoroastrian (i. e. Young Avestan) calendar in 503 BC and afterwards, the first day of the year (1 Farvardin, Nowruz) slipped against the vernal equinox at the rate of approximately one day every four years. (Note: A subsequent reform corrected this error.)

Likewise in the Egyptian calendar, a fixed year of 365 days was in use, drifting by one day against the sun in four years. An unsuccessful attempt to add an extra day every fourth year was made in 238 BC (Decree of Canopus). Caesar probably experienced this "wandering" or "vague" calendar in that country. He landed in the Nile Delta in October 48 BC and soon became embroiled in the Ptolemaic dynastic war, especially after Cleopatra managed to be "introduced" to him in Alexandria.

Caesar imposed a peace, and a banquet was held to celebrate the event. Lucan depicted Caesar talking to a wise man called Acoreus during the feast, stating his intention to create a calendar more perfect than that of Eudoxus (Eudoxus was popularly credited with having determined the length of the year to be 365 1/4 days). But the war soon resumed and Caesar was attacked by the Egyptian army for several months until he achieved victory. He then enjoyed a long cruise on the Nile with Cleopatra before leaving the country in June 47 BC.

Caesar returned to Rome in 46 BC and, according to Plutarch, called in the best philosophers and mathematicians of his time to solve the problem of the calendar. Pliny says that Caesar was aided in his reform by the astronomer Sosigenes of Alexandria who is generally considered the principal designer of the reform. Sosigenes may also have been the author of the astronomical almanac published by Caesar to facilitate the reform. Eventually, it was decided to establish a calendar that would be a combination between the old Roman months, the fixed length of the Egyptian calendar, and the 365 1/4 days of Greek astronomy. According to Macrobius, Caesar was assisted in this by a certain Marcus Flavius.

=== Adoption of the Julian calendar ===
Caesar's reform only applied to the Roman calendar. However, in the following decades many of the local civic and provincial calendars of the empire and neighbouring client kingdoms were aligned to the Julian calendar by transforming them into calendars with years of 365 days with an extra day intercalated every four years. The reformed calendars typically retained many features of the unreformed calendars. In many cases, the New Year was not on 1 January, the leap day was not on the traditional bissextile day, the old month names were retained, the lengths of the reformed months did not match the lengths of Julian months, and, even if they did, their first days did not match the first day of the corresponding Julian month. Nevertheless, since the reformed calendars had fixed relationships to each other and to the Julian calendar, the process of converting dates between them became quite straightforward, through the use of conversion tables known as "hemerologia".

The three most important of these calendars are the Alexandrian calendar and the Ancient Macedonian calendar─which had two forms: the Syro-Macedonian and the 'Asian' calendars. Other reformed calendars are known from Cappadocia, Cyprus and the cities of (Roman) Syria and Palestine. Unreformed calendars continued to be used in Gaul (the Coligny calendar), Greece, Macedon, the Balkans and parts of Palestine, most notably in Judea.

The Asian calendar was an adaptation of the Ancient Macedonian calendar used in the Roman province of Asia and, with minor variations, in nearby cities and provinces. It is known in detail through the survival of decrees promulgating it issued in 8 BC by the proconsul Paullus Fabius Maximus. It renamed the first month Dios as Kaisar, and arranged the months such that each month started on the ninth day before the kalends of the corresponding Roman month; thus the year began on 23 September, Augustus's birthday.

== Julian reform ==
=== Realignment of the year ===
The first step of the reform was to realign the start of the calendar year (1 January) to the tropical year by making 46 BC 445 days long, compensating for the intercalations which had been missed during Caesar's pontificate. This year had already been extended from 355 to 378 days by the insertion of a regular intercalary month in February. When Caesar decreed the reform, probably shortly after his return from the African campaign in late Quintilis (July), he added 67 more days by inserting two extraordinary intercalary months between November and December. (Note: It is not known why he decided that 67 was the correct number of days to add, nor whether he intended to align the calendar to a specific astronomical event such as the winter solstice. Ideler suggested (Handbuch der mathematischen und technischen Chronologie II 123–125) that he intended to align the winter solstice to a supposedly traditional date of 25 December.) The number may compensate for three omitted intercalary months (67 = 22+23+22). It also made the distance from 1 March 46 BC, the original New Year's Day in the Roman calendar, to 1 January 45 BC be 365 days.

These months are called Intercalaris Prior and Intercalaris Posterior in letters of Cicero written at the time; there is no basis for the statement sometimes seen that they were called "Undecimber" and "Duodecimber", terms that arose in the 18th century over a millennium after the Roman Empire's collapse. (Note: E.g., "... we have a sidelight on what was involved in "the year of confusion" as it was called. According to Dion Cassius, the historian, there was a governor in Gaul who insisted that, in the lengthened year, two months' extra taxes should be paid. The extra months were called Undecimber and Duodecimber". The eponymous dating of the cited passage Cassius 54.21 shows that it actually refers to an event of 15 BC, not 46 BC.) Their individual lengths are unknown, as is the position of the Nones and Ides within them.

Because 46 BC was the last of a series of irregular years, this extra-long year was, and is, referred to as the "last year of confusion". The new calendar began operation after the realignment had been completed, in 45 BC.

=== Months ===
The Julian months were formed by adding ten days to a regular pre-Julian Roman year of 355 days, creating a regular Julian year of 365 days. Two extra days were added to January, Sextilis (August) and December, and one extra day was added to April, June, September, and November. February was not changed in ordinary years, and so continued to be the traditional 28 days. Thus, the ordinary (i.e., non-leap year) lengths of all of the months were set by the Julian calendar to the same values they still hold today.

The Julian reform did not change the method used to account days of the month in the pre-Julian calendar, based on the Kalends, Nones and Ides, nor did it change the positions of these three dates within the months. Macrobius states that the extra days were added immediately before the last day of each month to avoid disturbing the position of the established religious ceremonies relative to the Nones and Ides of the month.

The inserted days were all initially characterised as dies fasti (F). The character of a few festival days was changed. In the early Julio-Claudian period a large number of festivals were decreed to celebrate events of dynastic importance, which caused the character of the associated dates to be changed to NP. However, this practice was discontinued around the reign of Claudius, and the practice of characterising days fell into disuse around the end of the first century AD: the Antonine jurist Gaius speaks of dies nefasti as a thing of the past.

=== Intercalation ===
The old intercalary month was abolished. The new leap day was dated as ante diem bis sextum Kalendas Martias ('the sixth doubled day before the Kalends of March'), usually abbreviated as a.d. bis VI Kal. Mart.; hence it is called in English the bissextile day. The year in which it occurred was termed annus bissextus, in English the bissextile year.

There is debate about the exact position of the bissextile day in the early Julian calendar. The earliest direct evidence is a statement of the 2nd-century jurist Celsus, who states that there were two-halves of a 48-hour day, and that the intercalated day was the "posterior" half. An inscription from AD 168 states that a.d. V Kal. Mart. was the day after the bissextile day. The 19th century chronologist Ideler argued that Celsus used the term "posterior" in a technical fashion to refer to the earlier of the two days, which requires the inscription to refer to the whole 48-hour day as the bissextile. Some later historians share this view. Others, following Mommsen, take the view that Celsus was using the ordinary Latin (and English) meaning of "posterior". A third view is that neither half of the 48-hour "bis sextum" was originally formally designated as intercalated, but that the need to do so arose as the concept of a 48-hour day became obsolete.

There is no doubt that the bissextile day eventually became the earlier of the two days for most purposes. In 238 Censorinus stated that it was inserted after the Terminalia (23 February) and was followed by the last five days of February, i.e., a.d. VI, V, IV, III and prid. Kal. Mart. (which would be 24 to 28 February in a common year and the 25th to 29th in a leap year). Hence he regarded the bissextum as the first half of the doubled day. All later writers, including Macrobius about 430, Bede in 725, and other medieval computists (calculators of Easter) followed this rule, as does the liturgical calendar of the Roman Catholic Church. However, Celsus' definition continued to be used for legal purposes. It was incorporated into Justinian's Digest, and in the English Statute De Anno et Die Bissextili of 1236, which was not formally repealed until 1879.

The effect of the bissextile day on the nundinal cycle is not discussed in the sources. According to Dio Cassius, a leap day was inserted in 41 BC to ensure that the first market day of 40 BC did not fall on 1 January, which implies that the old 8-day cycle was not immediately affected by the Julian reform. However, he also reports that in AD 44, and on some previous occasions, the market day was changed to avoid a conflict with a religious festival. This may indicate that a single nundinal letter was assigned to both halves of the 48-hour bissextile day by this time, so that the Regifugium and the market day might fall on the same date but on different days. In any case, the 8-day nundinal cycle began to be displaced by the 7-day week in the first century AD, and dominical letters began to appear alongside nundinal letters in the fasti.

=== Year length; leap years ===
The Julian calendar has two types of year: "normal" years of 365 days and "leap" years of 366 days. There is a simple cycle of three "normal" years followed by a leap year and this pattern repeats forever without exception. The Julian year is, therefore, on average 365.25 days long. Consequently, the Julian year drifts over time with respect to the tropical (solar) year (365.24217 days).

Although Greek astronomers had known, at least since Hipparchus, a century before the Julian reform, that the tropical year was slightly shorter than 365.25 days, the calendar did not compensate for this difference. As a result, the calendar year gains about three days every four centuries compared to observed equinox times and the seasons. This discrepancy was largely corrected by the Gregorian reform of 1582. The Gregorian calendar has the same months and month lengths as the Julian calendar, but, in the Gregorian calendar, year numbers evenly divisible by 100 are not leap years, except that those evenly divisible by 400 remain leap years (even then, the Gregorian calendar diverges from astronomical observations by one day in 3,030 years).

== Leap year error ==
Although the new calendar was much simpler than the pre-Julian calendar, the pontifices initially added a leap day every three years, instead of every four. There are accounts of this in Solinus, Pliny, Ammianus, Suetonius, and Censorinus.

Macrobius gives the following account of the introduction of the Julian calendar:

Caesar's regulation of the civil year to accord with his revised measurement was proclaimed publicly by edict, and the arrangement might have continued to stand had not the correction itself of the calendar led the priests to introduce a new error of their own; for they proceeded to insert the intercalary day, which represented the four quarter-days, at the beginning of each fourth year instead of at its end, although the intercalation ought to have been made at the end of each fourth year and before the beginning of the fifth. This error continued for thirty-six years by which time twelve intercalary days had been inserted instead of the number actually due, namely nine. But when this error was at length recognised, it too was corrected, by an order of Augustus, that twelve years should be allowed to pass without an intercalary day, since the sequence of twelve such years would account for the three days which, in the course of thirty-six years, had been introduced by the premature actions of the priests.

So, according to Macrobius,

1. the year was considered to begin after the Terminalia (23 February),
2. the calendar was operated correctly from its introduction on 1 January 45 BC until the beginning of the fourth year (February 42 BC) at which point the priests inserted the first intercalation,
3. Caesar's intention was to make the first intercalation at the beginning of the fifth year (February 41 BC),
4. the priests made a further eleven intercalations after 42 BC at three-year intervals so that the twelfth intercalation fell in 9 BC,
5. had Caesar's intention been followed there would have been intercalations every four years after 41 BC, so that the ninth intercalation would have been in 9 BC,
6. after 9 BC, there were twelve years without leap years, so that the leap days Caesar would have had in 5 BC, 1 BC and AD 4 were omitted and
7. after AD 4 the calendar was operated as Caesar intended, so that the next leap year was AD 8 and then leap years followed every fourth year thereafter.

Some people have had different ideas as to how the leap years went. The above scheme is that of Scaliger (1583) in the table below. He established that the Augustan reform was instituted in 8 BC. The table below shows for each reconstruction the implied proleptic Julian date for the first day of Caesar's reformed calendar and the first Julian date on which the Roman calendar date matches the Julian calendar after the completion of Augustus' reform.

Scholar	Date	Triennial leap years (BC)	First Julian day	First aligned day	Quadriennial leap year resumes
Bennett	2003	44, 41, 38, 35, 32, 29, 26, 23, 20, 17, 14, 11, 8	31 December 46 BC	25 February 1 BC	AD 4
Soltau	1889	45, 41, 38, 35, 32, 29, 26, 23, 20, 17, 14, 11	2 January 45 BC	25 February AD 4	AD 8
Matzat	1883	44, 41, 38, 35, 32, 29, 26, 23, 20, 17, 14, 11	1 January 45 BC	25 February 1 BC	AD 4
Ideler	1825	45, 42, 39, 36, 33, 30, 27, 24, 21, 18, 15, 12, 9	1 January 45 BC	25 February AD 4	AD 8
Kepler	1614	43, 40, 37, 34, 31, 28, 25, 22, 19, 16, 13, 10	2 January 45 BC	25 February AD 4	AD 8
Harriot	After 1610	43, 40, 37, 34, 31, 28, 25, 22, 19, 16, 13, 10	1 January 45 BC	25 February 1 BC	AD 4
Bünting	1590	45, 42, 39, 36, 33, 30, 27, 24, 21, 18, 15, 12	1 January 45 BC	25 February 1 BC	AD 4
Christmann	1590	43, 40, 37, 34, 31, 28, 25, 22, 19, 16, 13, 10	2 January 45 BC	25 February AD 4	AD 7
Scaliger	1583	42, 39, 36, 33, 30, 27, 24, 21, 18, 15, 12, 9	2 January 45 BC	25 February AD 4	AD 8

By the systems of Scaliger, Ideler and Bünting, the leap years prior to the suspension happen to be BC years that are divisible by 3, just as, after leap year resumption, they are the AD years divisible by 4.

Pierre Brind'Amour argued that "only one day was intercalated between 1/1/45 and 1/1/40 (disregarding a momentary 'fiddling' in December of 41) to avoid the nundinum falling on Kal. Ian."

Alexander Jones says that the correct Julian calendar was in use in Egypt in 24 BC, implying that the first day of the reform in both Egypt and Rome, 1 January 45 BC, was the Julian date 1 January if 45 BC was a leap year and 2 January if it was not. This necessitates fourteen leap days up to and including AD 8 if 45 BC was a leap year and thirteen if it was not. In 1999, a papyrus was discovered which gives the dates of astronomical phenomena in 24 BC in both the Egyptian and Roman calendars. From 30 August 26 BC (Julian), Egypt had two calendars: the old Egyptian in which every year had 365 days and the new Alexandrian in which every fourth year had 366 days. Up to 28 August 22 BC (Julian) the date in both calendars was the same. The dates in the Alexandrian and Julian calendars are in one-to-one correspondence except for the period from 29 August in the year preceding a Julian leap year to the following 24 February. From a comparison of the astronomical data with the Egyptian and Roman dates, Alexander Jones concluded that the Egyptian astronomers (as opposed to travellers from Rome) used the correct Julian calendar.

Because of the confusion about this period, we cannot be sure exactly what day (e.g. Julian day number) any particular Roman date refers to before March of 8 BC, except for those used in Egypt in 24 BC which are secured by astronomy.

An inscription has been discovered which orders a new calendar to be used in the Province of Asia to replace the previous Greek lunar calendar. According to one translation

Intercalation shall commence on the day after 14 Peritius [a.d. IX Kal. Feb, which would have been 15 Peritius] as it is currently constituted in the third year following promulgation of the decree. Xanthicus shall have 32 days in this intercalary year.

This is historically correct. It was decreed by the proconsul that the first day of the year in the new calendar shall be Augustus' birthday, a.d. IX Kal. Oct. Every month begins on the ninth day before the kalends. The date of introduction, the day after 14 Peritius, was 1 Dystrus, the next month. The month after that was Xanthicus. Thus Xanthicus began on a.d. IX Kal. Mart., and normally contained 31 days. In leap year, however, it contained an extra "Sebaste day", the Roman leap day, and thus had 32 days. From the lunar nature of the old calendar we can fix the starting date of the new one as 24 January, a.d. IX Kal. Feb 5 BC in the Julian calendar, which was a leap year. Thus from inception the dates of the reformed Asian calendar are in one-to-one correspondence with the Julian.

Another translation of this inscription is

Intercalation shall commence on the day after the fourteenth day in the current month of Peritius [a.d. IX Kal. Feb], occurring every third year. Xanthicus shall have 32 days in this intercalary year.

This would move the starting date back three years to 8 BC, and from the lunar synchronism back to 26 January (Julian). But since the corresponding Roman date in the inscription is 24 January, this must be according to the incorrect calendar which in 8 BC Augustus had ordered to be corrected by the omission of leap days. As the authors of the previous paper point out, with the correct four-year cycle being used in Egypt and the three-year cycle abolished in Rome, it is unlikely that Augustus would have ordered the three-year cycle to be introduced in Asia.

== Month names ==
The Julian reform did not immediately cause the names of any months to be changed. The old intercalary month was abolished and replaced with a single intercalary day at the same point (i.e., five days before the end of February).

=== Roman ===
The Romans later renamed months after Julius Caesar and Augustus, renaming Quintilis as "Iulius" (July) in 44 BC and Sextilis as "Augustus" (August) in 8 BC. Quintilis was renamed to honour Caesar because it was the month of his birth. According to a senatus consultum quoted by Macrobius, Sextilis was renamed to honour Augustus because several of the most significant events in his rise to power, culminating in the fall of Alexandria, occurred in that month.

Other months were renamed by other emperors, but apparently none of the later changes survived their deaths. In AD 37, Caligula renamed September as "Germanicus" after his father; in AD 65, Nero renamed April as "Neroneus", May as "Claudius" and June as "Germanicus"; and in AD 84 Domitian renamed September as "Germanicus" and October as "Domitianus". Commodus was unique in renaming all twelve months after his own adopted names (January to December): "Amazonius", "Invictus", "Felix", "Pius", "Lucius", "Aelius", "Aurelius", "Commodus", "Augustus", "Herculeus", "Romanus", and "Exsuperatorius". The emperor Tacitus is said to have ordered that September, the month of his birth and accession, be renamed after him, but the story is doubtful since he did not become emperor before November 275. Similar honorific month names were implemented in many of the provincial calendars that were aligned to the Julian calendar.

Other name changes were proposed but were never implemented. Tiberius rejected a senatorial proposal to rename September as "Tiberius" and October as "Livius", after his mother Livia. Antoninus Pius rejected a senatorial decree renaming September as "Antoninus" and November as "Faustina", after his empress.

=== Charlemagne ===
Much more lasting than the ephemeral month names of the post-Augustan Roman emperors were the Old High German names introduced by Charlemagne. According to his biographer, Einhard, Charlemagne renamed all of the months agriculturally in German. These names were used until the 15th century, over 700 years after his rule, and continued, with some modifications, to be used as "traditional" month names until the late 18th century. The names (January to December) were: Wintarmanoth ("winter month"), Hornung, (Note: This name of February, the only name in the list without the "month" suffix, is explained by König, Festschrift Bergmann (1997), pp. 425 ff. as a collective of horn, taken to refer to the antlers shed by red deer during this time. Older explanations compare the name with Old Frisian horning (Anglo-Saxon hornung-sunu, Old Norse hornungr) meaning "bastard, illegitimate son", taken to imply a meaning of "disinherited" in reference to February being the shortest of months.) Lentzinmanoth ("spring month", "Lent month"), Ostarmanoth ("Easter month"), Wonnemanoth ("joy-month", a corruption of Winnimanoth "pasture-month"), Brachmanoth ("fallow-month"), Heuuimanoth ("hay month"), Aranmanoth ("reaping month"), Witumanoth ("wood month"), Windumemanoth ("vintage month"), Herbistmanoth ("harvest month"), and Heilagmanoth ("holy month").

=== Eastern Europe ===
The calendar month names used in western and northern Europe, in Byzantium, and in the Berber calendar, were derived from the Latin names. However, in eastern Europe older seasonal month names continued to be used into the 19th century, and in some cases are still in use, in many languages, including: Belarusian, Bulgarian, Croatian, Czech, Finnish, Georgian, Lithuanian, Macedonian, Polish, Romanian, Slovene, Ukrainian. When the Ottoman Empire adopted the Julian calendar, in the form of the Rumi calendar, the month names reflected Ottoman tradition.

== Year numbering ==
The principal method used by the Romans to identify a year for dating purposes was to name it after the two consuls who took office in it, the eponymous period in question being the consular year. Beginning in 153 BC, consuls began to take office on 1 January, thus synchronizing the commencement of the consular and calendar years. The calendar year had begun in January and ended in December since about 450 BC according to Ovid or since about 713 BC according to Macrobius and Plutarch (see Roman calendar). Julius Caesar did not change the beginning of either the consular year or the calendar year. In addition to consular years, the Romans sometimes used the regnal year of the emperor, and by the late 4th century documents were also being dated according to the 15-year cycle of the indiction. In 537, Justinian required that henceforth the date must include the name of the emperor and his regnal year, in addition to the indiction and the consul, while also allowing the use of local eras.

In 309 and 310, and from time to time thereafter, no consuls were appointed. When this happened, the consular date was given a count of years since the last consul (called "post-consular" dating). After 541, only the reigning emperor held the consulate, typically for only one year in his reign, and so post-consular dating became the norm. Similar post-consular dates were also known in the west in the early 6th century. The system of consular dating, long obsolete, was formally abolished in the law code of Leo VI, issued in 888.

Only rarely did the Romans number the year from the founding of the city (of Rome), ab urbe condita (AUC). This method was used by Roman historians to determine the number of years from one event to another, not to date a year. Different historians had several different dates for the founding. The Fasti Capitolini, an inscription containing an official list of the consuls which was published by Augustus, used an epoch of 752 BC. The epoch used by Varro, 753 BC, has been adopted by modern historians. Indeed, Renaissance editors often added it to the manuscripts that they published, giving the false impression that the Romans numbered their years. Most modern historians tacitly assume that it began on the day the consuls took office, and ancient documents such as the Fasti Capitolini which use other AUC systems do so in the same way. However, Censorinus, writing in the 3rd century AD, states that, in his time, the AUC year began with the Parilia, celebrated on 21 April, which was regarded as the actual anniversary of the foundation of Rome.

Many local eras, such as the Era of Actium and the Spanish Era, were adopted for the Julian calendar or its local equivalent in the provinces and cities of the Roman Empire. Some of these were used for a considerable time. Perhaps the best known is the Era of Martyrs, sometimes also called Anno Diocletiani (after Diocletian), which was associated with the Alexandrian calendar and often used by the Alexandrian Christians to number their Easters during the 4th and 5th centuries, and continues to be used by the Coptic and Ethiopian churches.

In the eastern Mediterranean, the efforts of Christian chronographers such as Annianus of Alexandria to date the Biblical creation of the world led to the introduction of Anno Mundi eras based on this event. The most important of these was the Etos Kosmou, used throughout the Byzantine world from the 10th century and in Russia until 1700. In the west, the kingdoms succeeding the empire initially used indictions and regnal years, alone or in combination. The chronicler Prosper of Aquitaine, in the fifth century, used an era dated from the Passion of Christ, but this era was not widely adopted. Dionysius Exiguus proposed the system of Anno Domini in 525. This era gradually spread through the western Christian world, once the system was adopted by Bede in the eighth century.

The Julian calendar was also used in some Muslim countries. The Rumi calendar, the Julian calendar used in the later years of the Ottoman Empire, adopted an era derived from the lunar AH year equivalent to AD 1840, i.e., the effective Rumi epoch was AD 585. In recent years, some users of the Berber calendar have adopted an era starting in 950 BC, the approximate date that the Libyan pharaoh Sheshonq I came to power in Egypt.

== New Year's Day ==
The Roman calendar began the year on 1 January, and this remained the start of the year after the Julian reform. However, even after local calendars were aligned to the Julian calendar, they started the new year on different dates. The Alexandrian calendar in Egypt started on 29 August (30 August after an Alexandrian leap year). Several local provincial calendars were aligned to start on the birthday of Augustus, 23 September. The indiction caused the Byzantine year, which used the Julian calendar, to begin on 1 September; this date is still used in the Eastern Orthodox Church for the beginning of the liturgical year. When the Julian calendar was adopted in AD 988 by Vladimir I of Kiev, the year was numbered Anno Mundi 6496, beginning on 1 March, six months after the start of the Byzantine Anno Mundi year with the same number. In 1492 (AM 7000), Ivan III, according to church tradition, realigned the start of the year to 1 September, so that AM 7000 only lasted for six months in Russia, from 1 March to 31 August 1492.

In Anglo-Saxon England, the year most commonly began on 25 December, which, as (approximately) the winter solstice, had marked the start of the year in pagan times, though 25 March (the equinox) is occasionally documented in the 11th century. Sometimes the start of the year was reckoned as 24 September, the start of the so-called "western indiction" introduced by Bede. These practices changed after the Norman conquest. From 1087 to 1155 the English year began on 1 January, and from 1155 to 1751 it began on 25 March. In 1752 it was moved back to 1 January. (See Calendar [New Style] Act 1750).

Even before 1752, 1 January was sometimes treated as the start of the new year – for example in the Diary of Samuel Pepys – while the "year starting 25th March was called the Civil or Legal Year". To reduce misunderstandings on the date, it was not uncommon for a date between 1 January and 24 March to be written as "1661/62". This was to explain to the reader that the year was 1661 counting from March and 1662 counting from January as the start of the year. (For more detail, see Dual dating).

Country	Year starting 1 January	Adoption of new calendar
Holy Roman Empire (Note: The source has Germany, whose current area during the sixteenth century was a major part of the Holy Roman Empire, a religiously divided confederation. The source is unclear as to whether all or only parts of the country made the change. In general, Roman Catholic countries made the change a few decades before Protestant countries did.)	1544 (Note: Previously began on 25 December, with possible exceptions)	1582
Spain, Portugal, Polish–Lithuanian Commonwealth	1556	1582
Prussia, Denmark–Norway	1559	1700
Sweden	1559	1753 (Note: Sweden started a conversion process in 1700, which was abandoned later that year due to the Great Northern War, and in 1712 returned to the Julian calendar. In 1753 Sweden switched to the Gregorian calendar. See Swedish calendar.)
France	1567 (Note: Previously began on Easter Sunday, with several exceptions such as Lyon on 25 December and Vienne on 25 March)	1582
Southern Netherlands	1576	1582
Lorraine	1579	1760
Holland, Zeeland	1583	1582
Dutch Republic except Holland and Zeeland	1583	1700
Scotland	1600 (Note: Previously began on 25 March from 1155)	1752
Russia	1700 (Note: Previously began on 1 March from 988 until 1492, and 1 September from 1492)	1918
Tuscany	1750	1582
British Empire excluding Scotland	1752 (Note: Previously began on 25 March from 1155)	1752 (Note: 1751 in England only lasted from 25 March to 31 December. The dates 1 January to 24 March which would have concluded 1751 under the old calendar became part of 1752 when the beginning of the numbered year was changed from 25 March to 1 January.)
Republic of Venice	1522 (Note: Previously began on 1 March)	1582
Serbia	1804	1918
Ottoman Empire	1918	1917 (Note: See Rumi calendar for details. It is often stated that Turkey adopted the Gregorian calendar in 1926 or 1927: in fact this is when it adopted the AD/CE epoch.)

== Replacement by the Gregorian calendar ==
The Gregorian calendar has replaced the Julian as the civil calendar in all countries which had been using it – Greece being the last to do so, in 1923. The liturgical calendar used by Christian denominations in the west are almost all based on the Gregorian calendar, but most Eastern Orthodox churches continue to base theirs on the Julian.

A calendar similar to the Julian one, the Alexandrian calendar, is the basis for the Ethiopian calendar, which is still the civil calendar of Ethiopia. Egypt converted from the Alexandrian calendar to Gregorian on 1 Thaut 1592/11 September 1875.

During the changeover between calendars and for some time afterwards, dual dating was used in documents and gave the date according to both systems. In contemporary as well as modern texts that describe events during the period of change, it is customary to clarify to which calendar a given date refers by using an O.S. or N.S. suffix, denoting Old Style (Julian) or New Style (Gregorian).

=== Transition history ===
In 1582, Pope Gregory XIII promulgated the Gregorian calendar. Reform was required as the Julian calendar year, with an average length of 365.25 days, was longer than the natural tropical year. On average, the astronomical solstices and the equinoxes advance by 10.8 minutes per year against the Julian calendar year. As a result, 21 March (which is the base date for calculating the date of Easter) gradually moved out of alignment with the March equinox.

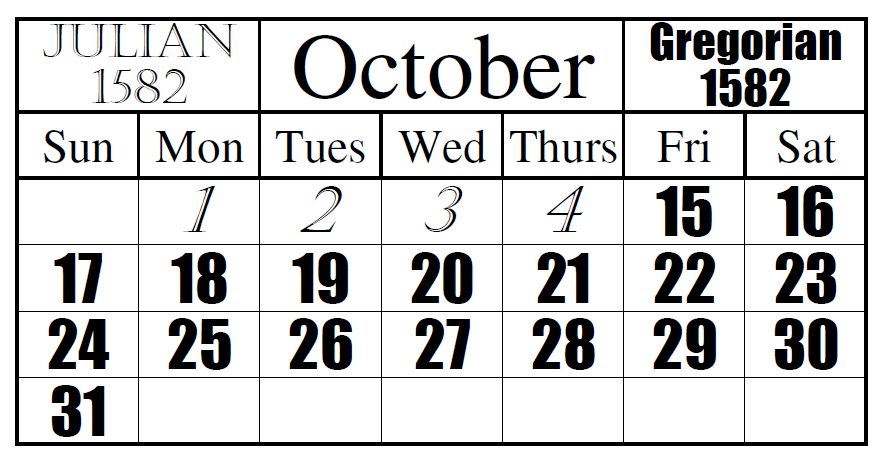
In 1582 when Roman Catholic countries such as Spain adopted the Gregorian calendar, ten days were omitted from the month of October.

While Hipparchus and presumably Sosigenes were aware of the discrepancy, although not of its correct value, it was evidently felt to be of little importance at the time of the Julian reform (46 BC). However, it accumulated significantly over time: the Julian calendar gained a day every 128 years. By 1582, 21 March was ten days out of alignment with the March equinox, the date where it was reckoned to have been in 325, the year of the Council of Nicaea.

Since the Julian and Gregorian calendars were long used simultaneously, although in different places, calendar dates in the transition period are often ambiguous, unless it is specified which calendar was being used. In some circumstances, double dates might be used, one in each calendar. The notation "Old Style" (O.S.) is sometimes used to indicate a date in the Julian calendar, as opposed to "New Style" (N.S.), which either represents the Gregorian date or the Julian date with the start of the year as 1 January. This notation is used to clarify dates from countries that continued to use the Julian calendar after the Gregorian reform, such as Great Britain, which did not adopt the reformed calendar until 1752, or Russia, which did not do so until 1918 (see Soviet calendar). This is why the Russian Revolution of 7 November 1917 N.S. is known as the October Revolution, because it began on 25 October O.S.

== Modern usage ==
=== Eastern Orthodox ===
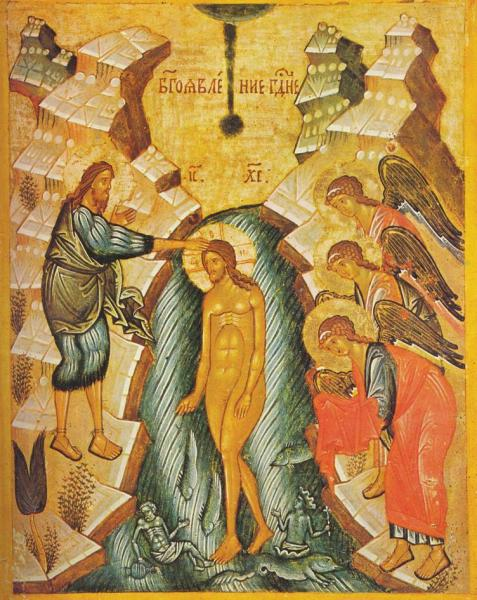
Russian icon of the Theophany (the baptism of Jesus by John the Baptist) (6 January), the highest-ranked feast which occurs on the fixed cycle of the Eastern Orthodox liturgical calendar

Although most countries where Eastern Orthodoxy predominates, (most of them in eastern or southeastern Europe) had adopted the Gregorian calendar by 1924, their national churches had not. The "Revised Julian calendar" was endorsed by a synod in Constantinople in May 1923, consisting of a solar part which was and will be identical to the Gregorian calendar until the year 2800, and a lunar part which calculated Easter astronomically at Jerusalem. All Eastern Orthodox churches refused to accept the lunar part, so all Orthodox churches continue to celebrate Easter according to the Julian calendar, with the exception of the Finnish Orthodox Church (and the Estonian Orthodox Church. from 1923 to 1945).

The Orthodox Churches of Jerusalem, Russia, Serbia, Montenegro, Poland (from 15 June 2014), North Macedonia, Georgia, the Greek Old Calendarists and other groups continue to use the Julian calendar, thus they celebrate the Nativity on 25 December Julian (which equates to 7 January Gregorian until 2100).

The Orthodox Church of Ukraine announced in late May 2023 that they would use the Gregorian calendar to celebrate Christmas on December 25, 2023, partly in reflection to Russia's invasion of the country in early 2022; the church continues to celebrate Easter on the date according to the Julian tradition.

==== Date of Easter ====
Most branches of the Eastern Orthodox Church use the Julian calendar for calculating the date of Easter, upon which the timing of all the other moveable feasts depends. Some such churches have adopted the Revised Julian calendar for the observance of fixed feasts, while such Orthodox churches retain the Julian calendar for all purposes.

=== Syriac Christianity ===
The Ancient Assyrian Church of the East, an East Syriac church, uses the Julian calendar, where its participants celebrate Christmas on 25 December (Julian calendar), which equates to 7 January (Gregorian calendar). The Assyrian Church of the East, the church it split from in 1968 – the replacement of traditional Julian calendar with Gregorian calendar being among the reasons – uses the Gregorian calendar ever since the year of that schism.

=== Oriental Orthodox ===
The Armenian Patriarchate of Jerusalem of Armenian Apostolic Orthodox Church uses Julian calendar, while the rest of Armenian Church uses Gregorian calendar. Both celebrate the Nativity as part of the Feast of Theophany according to their respective calendar.

=== Berbers ===
The Julian calendar is still used by the Berbers of the Maghreb in the form of the Berber calendar.

=== Foula ===
Foula in Shetland, Scotland, a small settlement on a remote island of the archipelago, still celebrates festivities according to the Julian calendar.

== See also ==
- Byzantine calendar – Orthodox calendar used c. 691–1728
- Conversion between Julian and Gregorian calendars
- Julian day – Days since the beginning of the Julian Period
- Julian year (astronomy) – Interval of exactly 365.25 Earth days
- List of adoption dates of the Gregorian calendar per country
- Mixed-style date – Date given in two different calendars
- Old New Year – Informal traditional holiday based on the Julian calendar
- Proleptic Gregorian calendar – Extension of the Gregorian calendar before its introduction
- Proleptic Julian calendar – Julian calendar extended backwards
- Revised Julian calendar – Calendar used by some Eastern Orthodox churches
- Roman timekeeping – Hour system with days divided into 24 hours
- Week – Time unit equal to seven days

== Sources ==
- Richards, E. G (1998). Mapping Time: The Calendar and its History. Oxford University Press. ISBN 978-0-19-286205-1.
- Richards, E. G. (2013). Urban, Sean E.; Seidelmann, P. Kenneth (eds.). Explanatory Supplement to the Astronomical Almanac (3rd ed.). Mill Valley, Calif: University Science Books. ISBN 978-1-891389-85-6.
