= Romanian calendar =

Calendar used in Romania

The Romanian calendar is the Gregorian calendar, adopted in 1919. However, the traditional Romanian calendar has its own names for the months. In modern Romania and Moldova, the Gregorian calendar is exclusively used for business and government transactions and predominates in popular use as well. Nevertheless, the traditional names of the months do appear in some contexts, for instance on ecclesiastical calendars produced by the Romanian Orthodox Church.

== History ==
Romania adopted the Gregorian calendar on 1 April 1919, which became 14 April 1919. In 2019, the National Bank of Romania released a commemorative coin of 10 silver lei to celebrate the centenary of Romania's adoption of the calendar.

== Traditional month names ==
Most of the traditional names of the months are of Latin origin, which indicates that their use predates the Slavic contact around the 8th century. Essentially all are constructed as agent nouns, most often with the suffix -ar, inherited from Latin -arius. As in Latin, the months are expressed using genitive constructions, i.e.: suntem în luna lui cuptor (literally: 'we are in the month of July').

Note that the use of lui cuptor as opposed to cuptorului indicates that the months are analysed as animate.

Month	Usual Romanian name	Traditional Romanian name	Etymology
January	ianuarie	gerar, cărindar	Gerar is derived from ger 'cold weather'; as winter reaches its depth during this month. Cărindar is inherited from Latin calendārium.
February	februarie	făurar, faur	Făurar is inherited from Latin februarius, though folk etymology connects it to unrelated a făuri 'to forge', whence the variant faur (which also means 'forger') arose.
March	martie	marț, mărțișor, germănar	Marț is inherited from Latin martius, and mărțișor originates as a derivative using the diminutive suffix -ișor that largely supplanted the former. It is unclear whether germănar is a creation of the poet Vasile Alecsandri or a genuine folk term; in any case, it is derived from germen 'sprout, bud'.
April	aprilie	prier, priir, florar	Prier is inherited from Latin aprilis; folk etymology connects it with a prii 'to have a good omen', hence the variant priir. Florar derives from floare 'flower', and is more frequently applied to March.
May	mai	florar, frunzar, prătar	See above for florar. Frunzar derives from frunză 'leaf'. Prătar derives from prat 'hayfield', and since this word was a late borrowing in Romanian, it is likely the most recent of the folk names.
June	iunie	cireșar	From cireș 'cherry tree'.
July	iulie	cuptor	From cuptor 'oven', as it is often the hottest month.
August	august	agust, gustar, măselar, secerar	Agust is inherited from Latin augustus. Folk etymology connected it with a gusta 'to taste', as fruit become ready for picking during this period, hence gustar. Măselar is likely derived from a lost term inherited from Latin messis 'harvest'. Secerar is derived from seceră 'sickle'.
September	septembrie	răpciune; vinimeriu, vinicer	Răpciune is inherited from Latin raptiōnem 'carrying off, abduction', likely reinterpreted as collecting crops in a harvest. Vinimeriu is derived from a lost noun related to Latin vindemia 'grape-gathering'. Vinicer has an uncertain etymology, but appears to be influenced by the former, and possibly by Church Slavonic виничиѥ 'vineyard'. Rarely, vinicer designates November instead of September.
October	octombrie	brumar, brumărel	Brumar is derived from brumă 'hoarfrost'. Brumărel is derived from the same word with a diminutive suffix. Brumărel generally designates October, and brumar generally designates November, though there is considerable disagreement on this.
November	noiembrie	brumar, brumărel, iezmăciune, promorar, vinicer	For brumar, brumărel, and vinicer, see above. Iezmăciune appears to be derived from iazmă 'ghost, evil spirit', though the semantic development is unclear. Promorar is derived from promoară (also meaning 'hoarfrost'), and its use is mainly restricted to Moldavia.
December	decembrie	neios, ningău, îndrea	Neios derives from nea 'snow'. Ningău derives from a ninge 'to snow'. Îndrea is the inherited Romanian form of the name Andrew, from Latin Andreas, as Saint Andrew's feast day, November 30, ushers in this month.

== See also ==
- Gregorian calendar
- Slavic calendar
- Lithuanian calendar
- French Republican calendar
