= Sosigenes (astronomer) =

Ancient Greek astronomer

- Σωσιγένης
- Known for: Consulted by Julius Caesar for the design of the Julian calendar
- Scientific career
- Fields: Astronomy

Sosigenes (Ancient Greek: Σωσιγένης) (fl. 1st century BC) was an Ancient Greek astronomer. According to Pliny the Elder's Natural History 18.210–212, Julius Caesar consulted him while he was designing the Julian calendar.

== Biography ==
Little is known about him apart from Pliny's Natural History. Sosigenes appears in Book 18, 210-212:

... There were three main schools, the Chaldaean, the Egyptian, and the Greek; and to these a fourth was added in our country by Caesar during his dictatorship, who with the assistance of the learned astronomer Sosigenes brought the separate years back into conformity with the course of the sun.

Sosigenes is credited with work on the orbit of Mercury, which is described by Pliny in book 2, Natural History:

The star next to Venus is Mercury, by some called Apollo; it has a similar orbit, but is by no means similar in magnitude or power. It travels in a lower circle, with a revolution nine days quicker, shining sometimes before sunrise and sometimes after sunset, but according to Cidenas and Sosigenes never more than 22 degrees away from the sun.

The introduction of the Julian year occurred in 46 BC. This particular year lasted 445 days in Rome to correct the erroneous old Roman calendar, and is thus considered "the longest year in history".

== Cultural depiction ==
Since the 18th century, the classicists have added to the name of Sosigenes, to distinguish it from others, the origin: "of Alexandria". However, no ancient source calls him that, or indicates that he was an Alexandrian. The misattribution may be from the fusion of two pieces of news about the reform of the Roman calendar at the initiative of Julius Caesar, namely: the indication by Appian, Cassius Dio and Macrobius that the reform was based on "Egyptian teachings" together with the news from Pliny that Sosigenes was one of the experts consulted by Caesar for the adaptation of the calendar.

The oldest mention of Sosigenes of Alexandria appears in the work of Le Fèvre de Morsan Des Moeurs et des Usages des Romains, published in 1739.

Sosigenes was portrayed by Hume Cronyn in the 1963 movie Cleopatra. This portrayal is heavily fictionalized: he serves as Cleopatra's tutor/adviser and later her envoy to Rome. He is ultimately murdered in the Forum by Octavian, commencing his war against Egypt. None of those events is present in the historical record, and they were invented for the film.

== See also ==
- Acoreus
