= Slovene months =

Slovene months have standard modern names derived from Latin names, as in most European languages. There are also archaic Slovene month names, mostly of Slavic origin, which exist in both a standardized set as well as many variations.

== Standard modern names ==
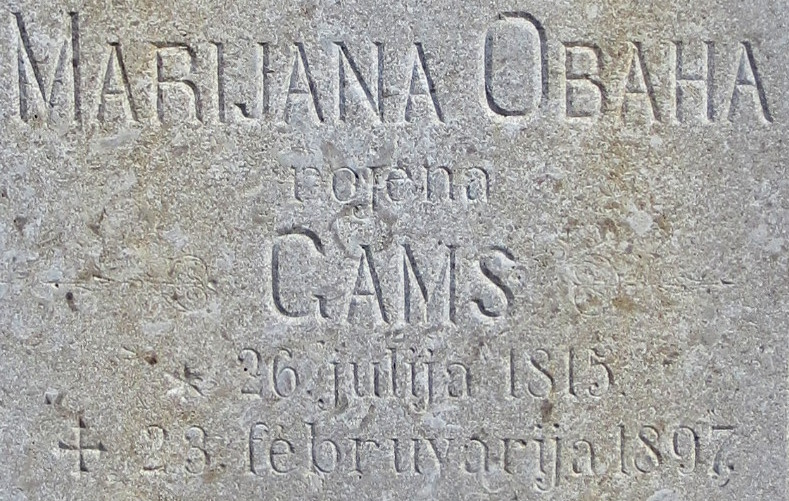
Gravestone with the archaic spelling februvarij 'February'

The standard modern Slovene month names are januar, februar, marec, april, maj, junij, julij, avgust, september, oktober, november, and december. When writing dates, they appear after the day and are often represented by Arabic numerals, and sometimes with Roman numerals (e.g., 19. 5. or 19. V. '19 May'). Older variants include januvarij 'January', februvarij 'February', and marcij 'March'.

== Standard archaic names ==
Many of the names in the standardized set of archaic Slovene month names first occur in the Škofja Loka manuscript, written in 1466 by Martin of Loka.

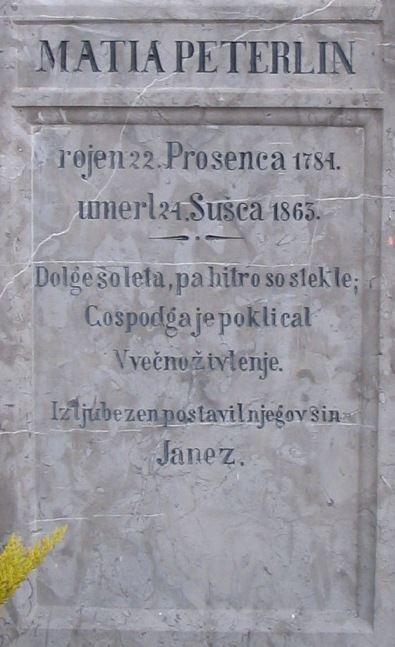
A gravestone in Rob with traditional Slovene month names: "Matia Peterlin. Born 22 January 1784, Died 24 March 1863. Long are the years, but quickly they have run their course. The Lord has called him into eternal life. Erected with love by his son Janez."

- January prosinec '(sun) shining through'; modern Slovene januar
- February svečan perhaps 'dry' or 'cut' (influenced by svečnica 'Candlemas'); modern Slovene februar
- March sušec '(earth) dry (enough for cultivation)'; modern Slovene marec
- April mali traven 'small grass'; modern Slovene april
- May veliki traven 'large grass'; modern Slovene maj
- June rožnik 'flowers' (a translation of German Rosenmonat); modern Slovene junij
- July mali srpan 'small sickle' (i.e., reaping); modern Slovene julij
- August veliki srpan 'large sickle' (i.e., reaping); modern Slovene avgust
- September kimavec 'nodding (fruit)'; modern Slovene september
- October vinotok 'wine flowing' (a translation of German Weinmonat); modern Slovene oktober
- November listopad 'falling leaves'; modern Slovene november
- December gruden 'biting (cold)' or 'clumped (earth)'; modern Slovene december

== Variant archaic month names ==
Multiple systems have been used in various Slovene-speaking regions, some of which were based on the names of saints (e.g., jurjevščak 'April', literally 'St. George's'), numbers (e.g., prvnik 'January', literally 'first'), or other features (e.g., vetrnik 'March', literally 'windy'). In the Prekmurje dialect of Slovene, the following system was attested: sečen 'January', süšec 'February', mali traven 'March', velki traven 'April', risalšček 'May', ivanšček 'June', jakopešček 'July', mešnjek 'August', mihalšček 'September', vsesvišček 'October', andrejšček 'November', božič 'December'.

=== By month ===
January

Additional names include brumen (< Italian bruma 'depth of winter'), sečen (related to suh 'dry' or from sek- 'cut'), ledenec and lednik (< led 'ice'), mali božičnjak and malobožičnjak (< mali božič 'Epiphany'), prozimec (probably contamination of prosinec with zima 'winter'), prvnik (< prvi 'first'), and zimec (< zima 'winter'). The name prosinec, associated with millet bread and the act of asking for something, was first written in the Škofja Loka manuscript.

February

Additional names include sečan and sečen (both related to suh 'dry' or from sek- 'cut'), and sečni mesec (< sek- 'cut'). The name svečan may relate to icicles or Candlemas. This name originates from sičan, written as svičan in the New Carniolan Almanac from 1775 and changed to its final form by Franc Metelko in his New Almanac from 1824. The name was also spelled sečan, meaning "the month of cutting down of trees". In 1848, a proposal was put forward in Kmetijske in rokodelske novice by the Slovene Society of Ljubljana to call this month talnik (related to ice melting), but it has not stuck. The idea was proposed by the priest and patriot Blaž Potočnik. A name of February in Slovene was also vesnar, after the mythological character Vesna.

March

Additional names include brezen and breznik (both from breza 'birch'), ebehtnik (< Middle High German ebennaht 'equinox'), gregorščak (< Gregor '(Saint) Gregory'), marcij, postnik (< post 'Lent'), traven (< trava 'grass'), and tretnik (< tretji 'third'). The name sušec was first written in the Škofja Loka manuscript.

April

Additional names include brezen (< breza 'birch') and jurijevščak (< Jurij '(Saint) George'). The name mali traven was first written in the Škofja Loka manuscript.

May

Additional names include cvetičnik and cvetnar (both < cvet 'flower'), majnik, mlečen (< mleč 'chicory'), risalščak and rusalščak (< risale/rusale 'Pentecost'), rožni mesec (< roža 'flower'), and sviben (< sviba '(flowering of) dogwood'). The name veliki traven was first written in the Škofja Loka manuscript.

June

Additional names include bobov cvet (literally, 'broad bean blossom') ivanjščak and šentjanževec (both referring to Saint John's Day), klasen (< klas 'head of grain'), kresnik (< kres 'bonfire', referring to Midsummer), prašnik (literally, 'stamen'), rožencvet and rožni cvet (both 'flower blossom'), and rženi cvet ('rye blossom').

July

Additional names include jakobnik and jakobščak (both referring to Saint James's Day), pšeničnik (< pšenica 'wheat'), and žetnik (< žetev 'reaping').

August

Additional names include kolovožnjak, medmašnik, mešnjak, otavnik, porcijunkula, velikomašnjak, and vršenj.

September

Additional names include jesenik, jesenščak, kozoprsk, miholščak, poberuh, and šmihelščnik.

October

Additional names include kozoprsk, listopad, lukovščak, moštnik, obročnik, repar, repnik, vinec, and vinščak.

November

Additional names include andrejščak, gnilolist, listognoj, martinščak, vsesvečnjak, and vsesvečak.

December

Additional names include kolednjak and veliki božičnjak (< božič 'Christmas').

== See also ==
- Croatian months
- Czech months
- Macedonian months
- Slavic calendar
