= Acoreus =

Egyptian wise man consulted by Julius Caesar

Acoreus was an Egyptian priest, astronomer, ... consulted by Julius Caesar, according to the Roman writer Lucanus, asking him many questions about ancient Egypt’s history and its calendar, but says he would like nothing as much as hearing the cause of the flooding of the Nile and to see its source. Acoreus proceeds to give an account of the Nile, including the time and possible causes of its flooding and its course.

Julius Caesar based his calendar on this Egyptian knowledge of the average solar year supplied by Sosigenes.

== See also ==
- Julian calendar
