= Symmetry454 =

Proposal for calendar reform

The Symmetry454 calendar (Sym454) is a proposal for calendar reform created in early 2004 by Dr. Irv Bromberg, an assistant professor at the University of Toronto, Canada (retired in 2018). It is a perennial solar calendar that conserves the traditional month pattern and 7-day week, has symmetrical equal quarters, and starts every month on Monday.

== Calendar year ==
The proposed calendar is laid out as follows:

Quarter
1st month
2nd month
3rd month
1st

January
Mo	Tu	We	Th	Fr	Sa	Su
1	2	3	4	5	6	7
8	9	10	11	12	13	14
15	16	17	18	19	20	21
22	23	24	25	26	27	28

February
Mo	Tu	We	Th	Fr	Sa	Su
1	2	3	4	5	6	7
8	9	10	11	12	13	14
15	16	17	18	19	20	21
22	23	24	25	26	27	28
29	30	31	32	33	34	35

March
Mo	Tu	We	Th	Fr	Sa	Su
1	2	3	4	5	6	7
8	9	10	11	12	13	14
15	16	17	18	19	20	21
22	23	24	25	26	27	28

2nd

April
Mo	Tu	We	Th	Fr	Sa	Su
1	2	3	4	5	6	7
8	9	10	11	12	13	14
15	16	17	18	19	20	21
22	23	24	25	26	27	28

May
Mo	Tu	We	Th	Fr	Sa	Su
1	2	3	4	5	6	7
8	9	10	11	12	13	14
15	16	17	18	19	20	21
22	23	24	25	26	27	28
29	30	31	32	33	34	35

June
Mo	Tu	We	Th	Fr	Sa	Su
1	2	3	4	5	6	7
8	9	10	11	12	13	14
15	16	17	18	19	20	21
22	23	24	25	26	27	28

3rd

July
Mo	Tu	We	Th	Fr	Sa	Su
1	2	3	4	5	6	7
8	9	10	11	12	13	14
15	16	17	18	19	20	21
22	23	24	25	26	27	28

August
Mo	Tu	We	Th	Fr	Sa	Su
1	2	3	4	5	6	7
8	9	10	11	12	13	14
15	16	17	18	19	20	21
22	23	24	25	26	27	28
29	30	31	32	33	34	35

September
Mo	Tu	We	Th	Fr	Sa	Su
1	2	3	4	5	6	7
8	9	10	11	12	13	14
15	16	17	18	19	20	21
22	23	24	25	26	27	28

4th

October
Mo	Tu	We	Th	Fr	Sa	Su
1	2	3	4	5	6	7
8	9	10	11	12	13	14
15	16	17	18	19	20	21
22	23	24	25	26	27	28

November
Mo	Tu	We	Th	Fr	Sa	Su
1	2	3	4	5	6	7
8	9	10	11	12	13	14
15	16	17	18	19	20	21
22	23	24	25	26	27	28
29	30	31	32	33	34	35

December
Mo	Tu	We	Th	Fr	Sa	Su
1	2	3	4	5	6	7
8	9	10	11	12	13	14
15	16	17	18	19	20	21
22	23	24	25	26	27	28
29	30	31	32	33	34	35

The last 7 days of December, shown in grey, are intercalary days that are appended only to the end of leap years.

The idea of months having 4 or 5 whole weeks is not new, having been proposed in the 1970s by Chris Carrier for the Bonavian Civil Calendar and by Joseph Shteinberg for his "Calendar Without Split Weeks". Whereas the former has 5 + 4 + 4 weeks per quarter, and the latter has 4 + 4 + 5 weeks per quarter, the Symmetry454 Calendar has a symmetrical 4 + 5 + 4 weeks per quarter, which is why it is named Symmetry454. Balanced quarters are desirable for businesses because they aid in fiscal planning and analysis.

All months have a whole number of weeks, so no month ever has a partial week. Each day number within a month falls on the same weekday in all months and years; in particular, Friday the 13th never occurs under this calendar.

All holidays, birthdays, anniversaries, etc. are permanently fixed. All ordinal day and week numbers within the year are also permanently fixed.

== Leap rule ==
Unlike the World Calendar or the International Fixed Calendar (also known as the 13-Month Calendar), there are no individually scheduled intercalary "null" days outside of the traditional 7-day week. Instead, alignment of the weekday cycle with New Year Day is accomplished by using a leap week, which is appended once every 6 or 5 years. In leap years, December becomes a 5-week month. The leap week is shown in grey text in the above calendar year.

The preferred Symmetry454 leap rule is based upon a symmetrical 293-year leap cycle having 52 leap years at intervals that are as uniformly spread as possible:

It is a leap year only if the remainder of (52 × Year + 146) / 293 is less than 52.

This expression inherently causes leap year intervals to fall into sub-cycle patterns of (5+6+6) = 17 or (5+6) = 11 years, which symmetrically group to 17+11+17 = 45 or to 17+17+11+17+17 = 79 years. The full symmetrical grouping for each cycle is: 45+79+45+79+45 = 293 years. Outside of calendar theory, this arrangement is known as maximal evenness.

The 52/293 leap cycle has a calendar mean year of 365+^{71}/_{293} days, or 365 days 5 hours 48 minutes and about 56.5 seconds, which is intentionally slightly shorter (to suit the tidal slowing of the Earth rotation rate) than the present era mean northward equinoctial year of 365 days 5 hours 49 minutes and 0 seconds (mean solar time).

== Calendar arithmetic ==
The Kalendis calendar calculator demonstrates the Symmetry454 calendar and interconverts dates between Symmetry454 and a variety of other calendars.

The Symmetry454 arithmetic is fully documented and placed in the public domain for royalty-free computer implementation.

Officially, Symmetry454 has been running since January 1, 2005, which was the first New Year Day after it came into existence. Its proleptic epoch, however, was on the same day as the proleptic epoch of the Gregorian Calendar = January 1, 1 AD.

== Easter on a fixed date ==
Tentatively, Sunday April 7 on the Symmetry454 Calendar is proposed as a fixed date for Easter, based on a frequency analysis of the distribution of the Gregorian or Astronomical Easter dates.

There are only five possible dates for Easter within the Symmetry454 Calendar, since only day numbers divisible by 7 can be a Sunday. The three highest-frequency dates upon which Easter can land are March 28, April 7, and April 14. Selecting the middle date (April 7) would fix Easter at its median position within its distribution range.

== See also ==
- 4–4–5 calendar: Similar month structure.
