= December 32 =

December 32 may refer to:

- 32 dicembre, a 1988 Italian comedy film by Luciano De Crescenzo
- December 32, an album by Byul, or its title song
- 32 Décembre, a volume of The Dormant Beast by Enki Bilal
- December 32, the date of Hogswatchnight in Hogfather by Terry Pratchett
- 32nd December Love Error, a 2009 Thai film
- Official date of LearAvia Lear Fan first flight in 1980

== See also ==
- February 29
- Leap year
- List of non-standard dates
