= Slavic calendar =

Language-specific calendar

While many Slavic languages officially use Latin-derived names for the months of the year in the Gregorian calendar, there is also a set of older names for the twelve months that differs from the Latin month names, as they are of Slavic origin. In some languages, such as the Serbian language these traditional names have since been archaized and are thus seldom used.

The original names of the months of the year in the Slavic languages closely follow natural occurrences such as weather patterns and conditions common for that period, as well as agricultural activities.

Many months have several alternative names in different regions; conversely, a single "Slavic name" may correspond to different "Roman names" (for different months, usually following each other) in different languages.

== Comparison table ==
The Slavic names of the months have been preserved by a number of Slavic people in a variety of languages. The conventional month names in some of these languages are mixed, including names which show the influence of the Germanic calendar (particularly Slovene, Sorbian, and Polabian) or names which are borrowed from the Gregorian calendar (particularly Polish and Kashubian), but they have been included here nonetheless.

In Latvian and Lithuanian, the Baltic names of the months are preserved, which partially coincide with the Slavic ones, which suggests that some of these names may date back to the time of Balto-Slavic linguistic unity. Latvian and Lithuanian names are also shown in this table for comparison.

Words are colored according to etymology.

Comparison of the traditional names for the twelve months in different Balto-Slavic languages
Language	January	February	March	April	May	June	July	August	September	October	November	December
Belarusian	студзень studzień	люты ljuty	сакавік sakavik	красавік krasavik	май* maj*	чэрвень červień	ліпень lipień	жнівень žnivień	верасень vierasień	кастрычнік kastryčnik	лістапад listapad	снежань sniežań
Belarusian	студзень studzień	люты ljuty	сакавік sakavik	красавік krasavik	травень travień	чэрвень červień	ліпень lipień	жнівень žnivień	верасень vierasień	кастрычнік kastryčnik	лістапад listapad	снежань sniežań
Ukrainian	січень sičeń	лютий ljutyj	березень berezen'	квітень kviten'	травень travień	червень červen'	липень lypen'	серпень serpen'	вересень veresen'	жовтень žovten'	листопад lystopad	грудень hruden'
Ukrainian	січень sičeń	лютень ljuten'	березень berezen'	квітень kviten'	травень travień	червень červen'	липень lypen'	серпень serpen'	вересень veresen'	жовтень žovten'	листопад lystopad	грудень hruden'
Rusyn	січень sičeń	лютый ljutyj	березень berezen'	цвітень cviten'	травень travień	червень červen'	липень lypen'	серпень serpen'	вересень veresen'	жолтень žolten'	листопад lystopad	грудень hruden'
Russian (Note: Pre-1918 spelling is given in parentheses.) archaic	сечень sečen'	лютень ljuten'	березозол (березозолъ) berezozol	цветень (цвѣтень) cveten'	травень travień	червень červen'	липец (липецъ) lipec	серпень serpen'	вересень veresen'	листопад (листопадъ) listopad	грудень gruden'	студень studen'
Old East Slavic	просиньць prosinĭcĭ	сѣчьнь sěčĭnĭ	соухꙑи suhyi	березозолъ berezozolŭ	травьнь travĭnĭ	изокъ izokŭ	чьрвьнь čĭrvĭnĭ	заревъ zarevŭ	роуинъ ruinŭ	листопадъ listopadŭ	гроудьнь grudĭnĭ	стоуденъ studenŭ
Old Church Slavonic	просиньць prosinĭcĭ	сѣчьнъ sěčĭnŭ	соухъ suhŭ	брѣзьнъ brězĭnŭ	трѣвьнъ trěvĭnŭ	изокъ izokŭ	чръвлѥнꙑи črŭvljenyi	заревъ zarevŭ	роуинъ ruinŭ	листопадъ listopadŭ	гроудьнъ grudĭnŭ	стоуденъ studenŭ
Bulgarian archaic	сечен sečen	люти ljuti	сухи suhi	брезен brezen	тревен treven	изок izok	червен červen	зарев zarev	руен ruen	листопад listopad	груден gruden	просинец prosinec
Macedonian archaic	коложег koložeg	сечко sečko	цутар cutar	тревен treven	косар kosar	жетвар žetvar	златец zlatec	житар žitar	гроздобер grozdober	листопад listopad	студен studen	снежник snežnik
Serbian archaic	коложег koložeg	сечко sečko	дерикожа derikoža	лажитрава lažitrava	цветањ cvetanj	трешњар trešnjar	жетвар žetvar	гумник gumnik	гроздобер grozdober	листопад listopad	студен studen	коледар* koledar*
Bosnian archaic	siječanj	veljača	ožujak	travanj	svibanj	lipanj	srpanj	kolovoz	rujan	листопад listopad	studeni	prosinac
Croatian	siječanj	veljača	ožujak	travanj	svibanj	lipanj	srpanj	kolovoz	rujan	листопад listopad	studeni	prosinac
Slovene archaic	prosinec	svečan	sušec	mali traven	veliki traven	rožnik	mali srpan	veliki srpan	kimavec	vinotok	listopad	gruden
Slovak archaic	veľký sečeň	malý sečeň	brezen (brezeň)	duben (dubeň)	květen (kveteň)	lipen (lipeň)	klasen (klaseň)	srpen (srpeň)	malý rujen	veľký rujen	listopad	mrazen (mrazeň)
Slovak archaic	ľadeň	sečeň	brezen (brezeň)	duben (dubeň)	květen (kveteň)	lipen (lipeň)	klasen (klaseň)	srpen (srpeň)	malý rujen	veľký rujen	listopad	mrazen (mrazeň)
Czech	leden	únor	březen	duben (dubeň)	květen (kveteň)	červen	červenec	srpen (srpeň)	září	říjen	listopad	prosinec
Polish	styczeń	luty	brzezień (archaic)	kwiecień	maj*	czerwiec	lipiec	sierpień	wrzesień	październik	listopad	grudzień
Polish	styczeń	luty	rowspan="3" marzec*	kwiecień	trawień (archaic)	czerwiec	lipiec	sierpień	wrzesień	październik	listopad	grudzień
Polish	styczeń	luty	łżykwiat (archaic)		trawień (archaic)	czerwiec	lipiec	sierpień	wrzesień	październik	listopad	grudzień
Silesian	styczyń	luty	kwjećyń	mŏj*	czyrwiec	lipjec	śyrpjyń	wrzesiyń	grudziyń	październik	listopad	
Silesian	styczyń	luty	kwjećyń	brzeziyń (archaic)	czyrwiec	trawiyń (archaic)	śyrpjyń	wrzesiyń	lipiyń	październik	listopad	prośńec
Kashubian	stëcznik	gromicznik	strëmiannik	łżëkwiat	môj*	czerwińc	lëpińc	zélnik	séwnik	rujan	lëstopadnik	gòdnik
Kashubian	stëcznik	luti	strëmiannik	kwiecéń	môj*	czerwińc	miodownik	serzpiéń	wrzeseń	pazdzérznik	lëstopadnik	grëdzéń
Upper Sorbian archaic	wulki róžk	mały róžk	nalětnik	jutrownik	róžownik	smažnik	pražnik	žnjenc	požnjenc	winowc	nazymnik	hodownik
Lower Sorbian archaic	wezymski	swěckowny	pózymski	jatšownik	rozhelony	smažki	žnjojski	jacmjeński	požnjenc	winski	młośny	zymski
Polabian extinct	ledemån	rüzac	zürmån	chåidemån	laisemån	pąťustemån	zeminik	haimån	jisinmån	vaińamån	zaimamån	trübnemån
Lithuanian Baltic, in use	sausis	vasaris	kovas	balandis	gegužė	birželis	liepa	rugpjūtis	rugsėjis	spalis	lapkritis	gruodis
Latvian Baltic, archaic	ziemas	sveču	sērsnu	sulu	lapu	ziedu	liepu	rudzu	viršu (silu)	veļu	salnas	vilku

* word of non-Slavic or non-Baltic origin

== Croatian months ==
The Croatian months used with the Gregorian calendar by Croats differ from the original Latin month names. While subject to variation over the earlier centuries, their names and order were standardised in the 1830s through the efforts of the Illyrian movement and its chief linguist Vjekoslav Babukić.

No.	Latin name	English name	Croatian name	Etymology
1	Ianuarius	January	sijȇčanj	from cutting or hewing wood but there are also dialectal terms svečan, svičen, sičan with the meaning 'festive', so there is the possibility of the meaning 'festive month' (as there are several holidays celebrated in January)
2	Februarius	February	vèljača	month in which days become longer, oveljiti se 'to get bigger'; or 'to wallow, to roll' valjati, to indicate unstable weather
3	Martius	March	òžujak	lying month (laž>ož; laž 'a lie'), because the weather changes often
4	Aprilis	April	trȃvanj	from growing grass, trava
5	Maius	May	svȋbanj	from budding cornel tree, svib
6	Iunius	June	lȋpanj	from linden tree, lipa
7	Iulius	July	sȓpanj	from reaping with a sickle, srp
8	Augustus	August	kȍlovōz	from driving a wagon (for harvest) — kolo 'wheel' + voz 'drive'
9	September	September	rȗjan	from an archaic verb for deer roaring or from a poetic word for 'blushing, rosy'
10	October	October	lȉstopād	from falling leaves — list 'leaf' + padati 'fall'
11	November	November	stùdenī	from cold, studen
12	December	December	pròsinac	'the beginning of the Sun's shining, to dawn' sinuti; or from sinji, greyish blue color

== Czech months ==
The names of Czech months are, as in Belarusian, Croatian, Kashubian, Polish, and Ukrainian, not based on the Latin names used in most European languages. The suffix -en is added to most of the months' names.

No.	Latin name	English name	Czech name	Etymology
1.	Ianuarius	January	leden	From led, 'ice'.
2.	Februarius	February	únor	Probably from the word root -nor-, infinitive form nořit (se), 'to plunge, to welter', as the ice welters under the lake surface.
3.	Martius	March	březen	Either from bříza, 'birch', or from březí, 'gravid, with young', as the forest animals, mainly hares and rabbits, are pregnant at that time.
4.	Aprilis	April	duben	Derived from dub, 'oak'.
5.	Maius	May	květen	From květ, 'blossom'. Originally máj, 'May'. The word květen first appeared in Jungmann's translation of Atala from 1805 as a poetism and translation for French lune de fleurs ('month of flowers'), but quickly gained acceptance. Jungmann was probably also influenced by the Polish word kwiecień ('April').
6.	Iunius	June	červen	Either from červený, 'red', or from červ, 'worm', both related to fruit.
7.	Iulius	July	červenec	The same as červen with a diminutive suffix –ec, lit. 'small červen'.
8.	Augustus	August	srpen	From srp, 'sickle' - used for harvesting.
9.	September	September	září	From Old Czech zářij, from za říje. (See říjen.) Folk etymology derives it from zářit, 'to blaze, glow, radiate, shine'.
10.	October	October	říjen	From říje, 'rutting', the time when the – mainly deer – males want to couple.
11.	November	November	listopad	Literally 'leaf-fall'.
12.	December	December	prosinec	Either from prosit, 'to pray, beg, to ask, to plead', possibly relating to holidays at this time, or from prosinalý, 'pallid', from siný, 'deep blue', because the sky is usually pallid at this time.

== Macedonian months ==
The Macedonian language has two sets of names of the months of the Gregorian calendar. The most commonly used set of names is derived from the Latin month names and these are used by the vast majority of the Macedonian population. However, there is also a set of older names for the twelve months of Slavic origin that differ from the Latin month names, although their usage is archaized and largely restricted to folk literature and religious calendars issued by the Macedonian Orthodox Church.

The origin of the Macedonian month names is closely related to the agricultural activities that occur in the corresponding period, or to the weather conditions common for that period. Some months have alternative names in different regions. The usage of modern Latin month names among Macedonians started towards the end of the 19th century, as a result of mass education.

No.	Latin name	English name	Macedonian Cyrillic	Macedonian Latin	Old Macedonian name	Transliteration	Etymology
1.	Ianuarius	January	Јануари	Januari	Коложег	Koložeg	Month of burning tree trunks
2.	Februarius	February	Февруари	Fevruari	Сечко	Sečko	Month of ice
3.	Martius	March	Март	Mart	Цутар	Cutar	Month of blossoming
4.	Aprilis	April	Април	April	Тревен	Treven	Month of grass
5.	Maius	May	Мај	Maj	Косар	Kosar	Time of flowering grasses and shrubs
6.	Iunius	June	Јуни	Juni	Жетвар	Žetvar	Time of maturity of the first yield of fruits
7.	Iulius	July	Јули	Juli	Златец	Zlatec	Golden month
8.	Augustus	August	Август	Avgust	Житар	Žitar	Month of wheat
9.	September	September	Септември	Septemvri	Гроздобер	Grozdober	Month of harvesting grapes
10.	October	October	Октомври	Oktomvri	Листопад	Listopad	Month of leaves falling
11.	November	November	Ноември	Noemvri	Студен	Studen	Month of cold
12.	December	December	Декември	Dekemvri	Снежник	Snežnik	Month of snow

== Polish months ==
The names of Polish months are, as in Belarusian, Croatian, Czech, Kashubian, and Ukrainian, not based on the Latin names used in most European languages, with the exception of March and May, which were borrowed from the Gregorian calendar.

No.	Latin name	English name	Polish name	Etymology
1.	Ianuarius	January	styczeń	Inherited from Old Polish sieczeń, from Proto-Slavic *sěčьnь ('winter month of cutting wood'), derived from Proto-Slavic *sěča ('cutting wood'), from Proto-Slavic *sěťi ('to cut'), with -ty- possibly by influence from the word *tyka ('pole, rod, branch, beam').
2.	Februarius	February	luty	Inherited from Old Polish luty, from Proto-Slavic *ľutъ ('harsh, cruel, severe').
3.	Martius	March	marzec	Borrowed from Middle High German marz, from Old High German merzo, from Latin Mārtius ('of or belonging to Mars, the god of war'). Displaced Old Polish brzezień.
4.	Aprilis	April	kwiecień	Inherited from Proto-Slavic *květьnь, derived from Proto-Slavic *květъ ('flower'). Diplaced Old Polish łżykwiat.
5.	Maius	May	maj	Borrowed from Latin Maius ('of or belonging to Maia, the goddess of growth'). Diplaced Old Polish trawień.
6.	Iunius	June	czerwiec	Inherited from Old Polish czyrwiec. By surface analysis, from czerw ('maggot; red dye made from bugs') + -iec. Diplaced Old Polish czyrwień possibly under influence of marzec and later lipiec.
7.	Iulius	July	lipiec	Inherited from Proto-Slavic *lipьcь. By surface analysis, from *lipa ('linden, lime-tree, basswood') + -iec. Diplaced Old Polish lipień.
8.	Augustus	August	sierpień	Inherited from Proto-Slavic *sŕ̥pьnь. By surface analysis, from *sierp ('sickle') + -eń.
9.	September	September	wrzesień	Derived from wrzos ('heather') + -eń.
10.	October	October	październik	Derived from paździerz ('boon, hurds, shives, shoves') + -nik.
11.	November	November	listopad	Inherited from Proto-Slavic *listopadъ. By surface analysis, from liść ('leaf') + -o- + padać ('to fall').
12.	December	December	grudzień	Inherited from Proto-Slavic *grudьnъ. By surface analysis, from gruda ('clod, heap, lump') + -eń.

== Russian months ==
In standard Russian, months have names of Latin origin, however names of Slavic origin have been attested in Russian rural dialects. They are not standardized; the table below shows one of the variants.

No.	Latin name	English name	Russian Cyrillic	Russian Latin	Russian name (archaic)	Transliteration	Etymology
1.	Ianuarius	January	Январь	Janvar'	Сечень	Sečen'	Month of cutting wood
2.	Februarius	February	Февраль	Fevral'	Лютень	Ljuten'	Month of harshing
3.	Martius	March	Март	Mart	Берeзозол (Берeзозолъ)	Berezozol	Month of birch
4.	Aprilis	April	Апрель	Aprel'	Цветень (Цвѣтень)	Cveten'	Month of blossoming
5.	Maius	May	Май	Maj	Травень	Traven'	Month of grass
6.	Iunius	June	Июнь	Ijun'	Червень	Červen'	Month of gules
7.	Iulius	July	Июль	Ijul'	Липец (Липецъ)	Lipec	Month of linden tree
8.	Augustus	August	Август	Avgust	Серпень	Serpen'	Month of sickle
9.	September	September	Сентябрь	Sentjabr'	Вересень	Veresen'	Month of heather
10.	October	October	Октябрь	Oktjabr'	Листопад (Листопадъ)	Listopad	Month of leaves falling
11.	November	November	Ноябрь	Nojabr'	Грудень	Gruden'	Month of heap
12.	December	December	Декабрь	Dekabr'	Студень	Studen'	Month of cold

== Slovene months ==
Many of the names in the standardized set of archaic Slovene month names first occur in the Škofja Loka manuscript, written in 1466 by Martin of Loka.

No.	Latin name	English name	Slovene name	Slovene name (archaic)	Etymology
1.	Ianuarius	January	januar	prosinec	'(sun) shining through';
2.	Februarius	February	februar	svečan	perhaps 'dry' or 'cut' (influenced by svečnica 'Candlemas');
3.	Martius	March	marec	sušec	'(earth) dry (enough for cultivation)';
4.	Aprilis	April	april	mali traven	'small grass';
5.	Maius	May	maj	veliki traven	'large grass';
6.	Iunius	June	junij	rožnik	'flowers' (a translation of German Rosenmonat);
7.	Iulius	July	julij	mali srpan	'small sickle' (i.e., reaping);
8.	Augustus	August	avgust	veliki srpan	'large sickle' (i.e., reaping);
9.	September	September	september	kimavec	'nodding (fruit)';
10.	October	October	oktober	vinotok	'wine flowing' (a translation of German Weinmonat);
11.	November	November	november	listopad	'falling leaves';
12.	December	December	december	gruden	'biting (cold)' or 'clumped (earth)';

== Ukrainian months ==
The names of the months in Standard Ukrainian are all derived from Slavic roots with no Latin borrowings. The suffix -ень (-en) is added to most of the months' names. In some regions of Ukraine, Latin month names are used vernacularly, along with the Slavic ones, reflecting the traditional regional calendrical practices of previous centuries.

№	Months		Transliteration	Etymology
№	English name	Ukrainian name	Transliteration	Etymology
1.	January	січень	sičen'	Derives from Ukrainian: січище, січа – 'place, cleared from trees and plants', which is itself derived from Old East Slavic: сѣча (of the same meaning). It is a reference to slash-and-burn agricultural practice.
2.	February	лютий (arch. лютень)	ljutyj (ljuten')	Derives from Ukrainian: лютий – 'fierce, savage'. It was called so due to an extremely cold temperatures. Both names were used simultaneously up to the first half of the 20th century, but the simplified adjective form prevailed eventually.
3.	March	березень	berezen'	Derives from Ukrainian: береза – 'birch'. Birches usually begin to bloom in the end of March, which is also a time of birch sap collection.
4.	April	квітень	kviten'	Derives from Ukrainian: квіт, цвіт – 'bloom'. It was called so due to the intensive blooming of most known species of flowers, growing in Ukraine. It also has connections with the birch bloom.
5.	May	травень	traven'	From Ukrainian: трава – 'grass'. The name comes from various grasses that abundantly cover the earth with green growth in this months.
6.	June	червень	červen'	From Ukrainian: червець – 'cochineal', a bug active in the first half of summer. The month used to share this name with the bug previously.
7.	July	липень	lypen'	From Ukrainian: липа – 'linden'. This name is associated with the exuberant flowering of linden trees and the period of collecting linden honey.
8.	August	серпень	serpen'	From Ukrainian: серп – 'sickle'. This month marks the start of grain harvest in Ukraine. Sickle is the most known tool used in this process.
9.	September	вересень	veresen'	From Ukrainian: верес – 'heather'. Heather is a honey plant, which usually begins to bloom in the start of this month.
10.	October	жовтень	žovten'	From Ukrainian: жовте – 'yellow'. This name comes from the autumn yellowing of leaves.
11.	November	листопад	lystopad	Literally 'leaf-fall'. It is a combination of the Ukrainian words листя and пад – 'leaves' and 'fall', respectively.
12.	December	грудень	hruden'	From Ukrainian: грудка – 'lump'. A reference to snow conditions during the month.

== See also ==
- Lithuanian calendar
- Slavic Native Faith's calendars and holidays
- Germanic calendar
- Julian calendar
- Romanian calendar
- Slovene months
