= 4–4–5 calendar =

Method of managing accounting periods

The 4–4–5 calendar is a method of telling accounting periods, and is a common calendar structure for some industries such as retail and manufacturing. It divides a year into four quarters of 13 weeks, each grouped into two 4-week "months" and one 5-week "month". The longer "month" may be set as the first (5–4–4), second (4–5–4), or third (4–4–5) unit. Depending on local customs, a week either begins or ends on Sunday – and therefore the "months" as well.

== Benefits ==
Its major advantage over a regular calendar is that each period is the same length and ends on the same day of the week, which is useful for planning manufacturing or work shifts.

A disadvantage is that comparisons or trend analysis by "month" are flawed, as one month is a week longer than the other two, whereas comparisons between weeks or quarters, or to the same "month" in the previous year are still useful. Another disadvantage is that the 4–4–5 calendar has only 364 days (7 days x 52 weeks), meaning a 53rd week must be added every five or six years: this can make year-on-year comparison difficult.

== 52–53-week fiscal year ==
A variation is the 52–53-week calendar. It is used by companies that want their fiscal year to always end on the same day of the week. Any day of the week may be used, and Saturday and Sunday are common because the business may more easily be closed for counting inventory and other end-of-year accounting activities.

There are two methods permitted by generally accepted accounting principles in the United States, by US Internal Revenue Code Regulation 1.441-2 IRS Publication 538, as well as the International Financial Reporting Standards.

=== Last Saturday of the final month ===
Under this method, the company's fiscal year is defined as the final Saturday (or other day selected) in the fiscal year end month.

For example, if the fiscal year end month is August, the company's year end could fall on any date from August 25 to August 31. In particular, the last fiscal week is the one that includes August 25 and the first fiscal week of the following year is the one that includes September 1. In this scenario, fiscal years would end on the following days:

- 2025 August 30
- 2026 August 29
- 2027 August 28
- 2028 August 26
- 2029 August 25
- 2030 August 31

The end of the fiscal year moves one day earlier on the calendar each year (or two days when there is an intervening leap day) until it would otherwise reach the date seven days before the end of the month (August 24 in this case) or earlier. At that point, it resets to the end of the month (August 31) or earlier and the fiscal year has 53 weeks instead of 52. On the above chart, fiscal years 2024 and 2030 have 53 weeks.

=== Saturday nearest the end of the final month ===
Under this method the company's fiscal year is defined as the Saturday (or other day selected) that falls closest to the last day of the fiscal year end month. For Saturday, this ends up being equivalent to the week-date rule from ISO 8601 which ensures that the first week of the year contains four or more days (i.e. its majority) of that year, which includes the first Thursday and January 4.

For example, if the fiscal year end month is August, the company's year end could fall on any date from August 28 to September 3. In particular, the last fiscal week is the one that includes August 28 and the first fiscal week of the following year is the one that includes September 4. In this scenario, fiscal years would end on the following days:

- 2025 August 30
- 2026 August 29
- 2027 August 28
- 2028 September 2
- 2029 September 1
- 2030 August 31

The end of the fiscal year moves one day earlier on the calendar each year (or two days when there is an intervening leap day) until it would otherwise reach the date four days before the end of the month (August 27 in this case) or earlier. At that point, the first Saturday in the following month (September 3 or earlier in this case) becomes the date closest to the end of August and it resets to that date and the fiscal year has 53 weeks instead of 52. On the above chart, fiscal years 2028 and 2033 have 53 weeks.

== See also ==
- Accounting period
- Symmetry454
