= Macedonian months =

Names of Macedonian months

The Macedonian calendar is the calendar traditionally used in North Macedonia. It has names for all twelve months in the year, which are accepted in the country and are called using standard international name forms which stem from Latin names of the months, have their own Macedonian names which in the current language are considered archaic and are most commonly used in official matters and documents (for instance religious calendars) of the Macedonian Orthodox Church as well as in some rural regions in North Macedonia. The origin of the Macedonian names of months is closely related to natural changes of weather and agriculture which happen during the period of the month. Some months also have several terms used in different regions of the country. Today's modern names of the months were first being used towards the end of the 19th century, most commonly with the suffix -ја as for instance in words such as јануарија (januarja), февруарија (fevruarija), септемврија (septemvrija), декемврија (dekemvrija) etc. Their full acceptance and use in everyday speech came into effect with the process of mass education of school pupils.

== Macedonian names of the months ==
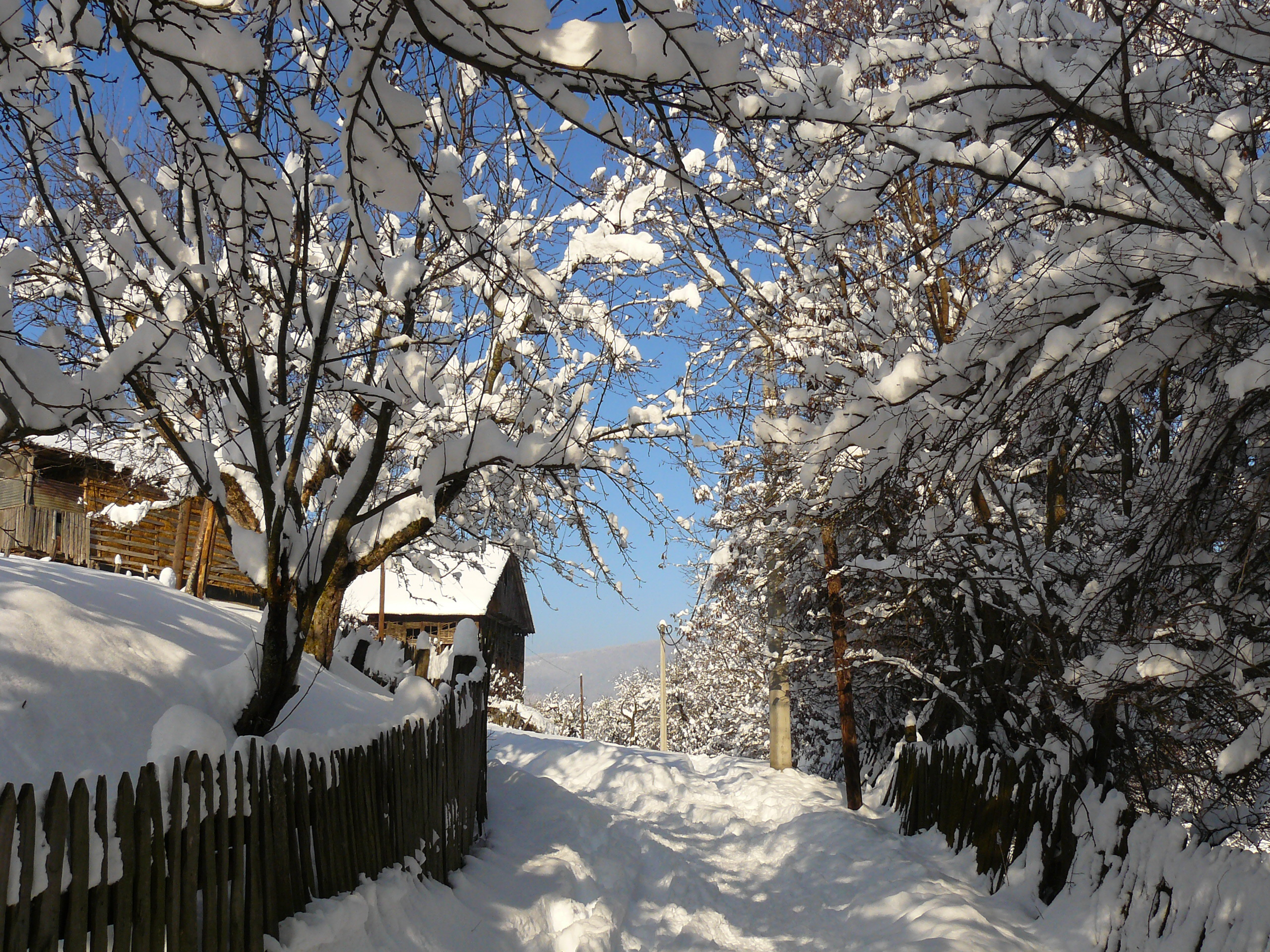
Snežnik (December) is called by the month of December which is when it is usually snowing (sneg - snow). On the picture: a road in the village of Tajmište, Kičevo.

Number	Standard name	Original name	Description
1.	јануари (januari)	коложег (koložeg)	the month of burning wood
2.	февруари (fevruari)	сечко (sečko)	the month of ice
3.	март (mart)	цутар (cutar)	the month of blossoming
4.	април (april)	тревен (treven)	the month of grass
5.	мај (maj)	косар (kosar)	the month of cutting grass
6.	јуни (juni)	жетвар (žetvar)	the month of harvest
7.	јули (juli)	златец (zlatec)	the month of gold
8.	август (avgust)	житар (žitar)	the month of grains
9.	септември (septemvri)	гроздобер (grozdober)	the month of grape harvesting
10.	октомври (oktomvri)	листопад (listopad)	the month of leaves falling
11.	ноември (noemvri)	студен (studen)	the cold month
12.	декември (dekemvri)	снежник (snežnik)	the month of snow

== Common month names in different regions of North Macedonia ==
In Gevgelija, S. Tanovikj noted common month names which are displayed in the aforementioned table and there is a difference in the names for May - crešar, June - žitvar, July - biljar, August - prabraždenski, September - bugurojčin (or gruzdober), October - mitrovski or kasim, November - listupad and December - gulemijut mesic or bužikjov.

Common names of the months in the village of Valandovo Pirava are the following: koložeg - January, sečko - February, letnik - March, treven - April, cutnik - May, crvenik - June, gorešnik - July, gumnar - August, grozdober - September, listokap - October, snežen - November, student - December.

In the region of Bošavija, in the foot of the mountain Kožuf in Kavadarci there are different names and explanations for the names of months. For the month of November, the name alistopo was used, for December andreja and people believed that it was the period of the start of winter and Andreja was a person who was throwing snowflakes. For the month of January, the name koložeg was used with the explanation that it was the worst winter month and that "regardless of where you are, you should be at home in January. You should possess a car with wood and flour". It is also noted through a legent that the name of the month koložeg came from the cold weather in that month which caused people not to have means of heat, so they were forced to burn their wooden carriages.

In the Macedonian ethnic region Golo Brdo in Albania, the following names and forms are used for certain months: koložek or kolodžek for January, čerešnar or crešnar for June, žetvar for July, dorvar or drvar for November and jodre for December.

== Common counting of the duration of months ==
According to research performed by ethnologists and anthropologists, the duration of months of the culture of Macedonians was usually counted and determined according to certain holidays and festivities, called medžnici or sinori. Those are the big Christian holidays that exist in each month of the year. The duration of months among common Macedonian people looked like this:

- јануари - from Vrtolom to Vasilica
- коложег - from Vasilica to Saint Tryphon
- сечко - from Saint Tryphon to Letnik
- марта - from Letnik to Blagovec
- април - from Blagovec to Eremija
- мај - from Eremija (Gjurgjovden) to Duhovden.
- јуни - from Duhovden to Ivanden
- јули - from Ilinden to Golema Bogorodica
- август - from Golema Bogorodica to Krstovden
- септември - from Krstovden to Petkovden
- октомври - from Petkovden to Mitrovden
- ноември - from Mitrovden to Prečista
- декември - from Prečista to Saint Ana or Saint Ignat.

This calendar indicates a year consisting of 13 months which is equivalent with the number of monthly changes in the duration of a year. This in turn demonstrates that people from the past determined months and oriented themselves according to the number of changes of the moon in a year.

== See also ==
- Slavic calendar
- Julian calendar
