= Arabic month names =

Arabic-language names for months in different calendars

Arabic month names are the Arabic-language names for months in a number of different calendars.

- Arabic names of Gregorian months
- Months of the Islamic calendar
- Pre-Islamic month names

== See also ==
- Gregorian calendar
- Islamic calendar
- Pre-Islamic Arabian calendar
