= Turkish months =

Months of the Gregorian Calendar in the Turkish language

The month names in Turkish are derived from three languages: either from Latin, Levantine Arabic (which itself took its names from Aramaic), or from a native Turkish word. The Arabic-Aramaic month names themselves originate in the ancient Babylonian calendar, and are therefore cognate with the names of months in the Hebrew calendar, specifically Shevat, Nisan, Tammuz and Elul. The original Babylonian months were actual lunar months, as the Hebrew months of the same names are to this day, much like months in the Islamic calendar. Turkey has used Gregorian AD year numbering officially since 1926, though Gregorian calendar dates were in use since March 1917. The names of the months from February to September had been used in the now abandoned Rumi calendar, with the other four still retaining their old Arabic/Aramaic names. In 1945, four of them received names of Turkish origin by law number 4696 passed January 10, 1945.

English	Turkish	Etymology
January	ocak	Turkish origin, meaning "stove". Literal translation of Arabic word "kānūn". Until 1945, kânunusani
February	şubat	Arabic origin (Šubāṭ), taken from Aramaic, ultimately from Akkadian; cognate with the Hebrew month Shevat
March	mart	Latin origin (Martius)
April	nisan	Arabic origin (Nīsān), taken from Aramaic, ultimately from Akkadian; cognate with the Hebrew month Nisan
May	mayıs	Latin origin Maius from the Greek Goddess Maia, who was identified with the Roman era goddess of fertility,
June	haziran	Arabic origin (Ḥazīrān), taken from Aramaic; from ḥzīrā’ (“boar”), by association of Sirius, which rises in the summer, with the boar-god Ninurta.
July	temmuz	Arabic origin (Tammūz), taken from Aramaic, ultimately from the name of the Akkadian deity Dumuzi; cognate with the Hebrew month Tammuz
August	ağustos	Latin origin (Augustus)
September	eylül	Arabic origin (Aylūl), taken from Aramaic, ultimately from Akkadian; cognate with the Hebrew month Elul
October	ekim	Turkish origin, meaning "sowing" (of seeds) Until 1945, teşrinievvel
November	kasım	Arabic origin word which means "divider". This word refers to the beginning of winter. According to a Turkish weather proverb, winter begins on 8 November. Until 1945, teşrinisani
December	aralık	Turkish origin, meaning "gap" Until 1945, kânunuevvel

== See also ==
- Islamic calendar
- Arabic names of calendar months
- Rumi calendar
- Hebrew calendar
- Babylonian calendar
