= Babylonian calendar =

Lunisolar calendar

Calendar of Nippur, Third Dynasty of Ur

The Babylonian calendar was a lunisolar calendar used in Mesopotamia from around the 2nd millennium BC until the Seleucid Era (294 BC), and it was specifically used in Babylon from the Old Babylonian Period (1780s BC) until the Seleucid Era.

In the Seleucid Era it was reformed as "Greek time", Anno Graecorum was introduced and used in the Middle East and Egypt until the middle of the first millennium when the First Council of Nicaea AD 325 defined the Church year based on the Roman early Julian calendar. As Anno Graecorum formed the basis for time references in the Bible and spread westward, it rather increased the importance of the Babylonian calendar. The Babylonian calendar is also partly reflected in calendars in South and East Asia and the Islamic calendar as well as Iranian calendars. The Julian calendar inherited the definitions of the 12 month system, week, hour etc. from the Babylonian calendar and the current Jewish calendar can be seen as a slightly modified Babylonian calendar that still exists today and is practised, but with Anno Mundi Livryat haOlam year calculation since the creation of the world. Today's global time system UTC (Gregorian calendar) therefore has its main structure inherited from the Babylonian calendar.

The Julian calendars have their month definitions in tabular form while the Babylonian calendar, the Jewish calendar, and the Muslim calendar have their months defined by the appearance of the new moon and Iranian calendars by solstice.

The civil lunisolar calendar was used contemporaneously with an administrative calendar of 360 days, with the latter used only in fiscal or astronomical contexts. The lunisolar calendar descends from an older Sumerian calendar used in the 4th and 3rd millennium BC.

The civil lunisolar calendar had years consisting of 12 lunar months, each beginning when a new crescent moon was first sighted low on the western horizon at sunset, plus an intercalary month inserted as needed, at first by decree and then later systematically according to what is now known as the Metonic cycle.

Month names from the Babylonian calendar appear in the Hebrew calendar, Assyrian calendar, Syriac calendar, Old Persian calendar, and Turkish calendar.

== Civil calendar ==
The Babylonian civil calendar, also called the cultic calendar, was a lunisolar calendar descended from the Nippur calendar, which has evidence of use as early as 2600 BCE and descended from the even older Third Dynasty of Ur (Ur III) calendar. The original Sumerian names of the months are seen in the orthography for the next couple millennia, albeit in more and more shortened forms. When the calendar came into use in Babylon circa 1780 BCE, the spoken month names became a mix from the calendars of the local subjugated cities, which were Akkadian. Historians agree that it was probably Samsu-iluna who effected this change. During the sixth century BCE Babylonian captivity of the Jews, these month names were adopted into the Hebrew calendar.

The first month of the civil calendar during the Ur III and Old Babylonian periods was Šekinku (Akk. Addaru), or the month of barley harvesting, and it aligned with the vernal equinox. However, during the intervening Nippur period, it was the twelfth month instead.

Until the 5th century BCE, the calendar was fully observational, and the intercalary month was inserted approximately every two to three years, at first by guidelines which survive in the MUL.APIN tablet. Beginning in around 499 BCE, the intercalation began to be regulated by a predictable lunisolar cycle, so that 19 years comprised 235 months. Although this 19-year cycle is usually called the Metonic cycle after Meton of Athens (432 BCE), the Babylonians used this cycle before Meton, and it may be that Meton learned of the cycle from the Babylonians. After no more than three isolated exceptions, by 380 BCE the months of the calendar were regulated by the cycle without exception. In the cycle of 19 years, the month Addaru 2 was intercalated, except in the year that was number 17 in the cycle, when the month Ulūlu 2 was inserted instead.

During this period, the first day of each month (beginning at sunset) continued to be the day when a new crescent moon was first sighted—the calendar never used a specified number of days in any month. However, as astronomical science grew in Babylon, the appearance of the new moon was predictable with some accuracy into the short-term future. Still, during the Neo-Assyrian period (c. 700 BCE) the calendar was sometimes retroactively "shifted back" a day to account for the fact that the king should have declared a new month, but only did so the following day because of obstructive weather.

Civil calendar
	Sumerian month names	Akkadian month names	Equivalents			
	Sumerian month names	Akkadian month names	Hebrew	Mandaean	Levantine and Iraqi	Gregorian
1	𒌚𒁈𒍠(𒃻) ^{ITI}BARA_{2}.ZAG(.GAR) – 'Month [the proxies of the gods are] placed besides the throne'	Araḫ Nisānu – 𒌚𒁈	Nisan נִיסָן	Nisan ࡍࡉࡎࡀࡍ	Naysān نَيْسَان	Mar/April
2	𒌚[𒂡]𒄞𒋛𒋤 ^{ITI}[EZEM.]GU_{4}.SI.SU_{3} – 'Month the horned oxen marched forth'	Araḫ Āru - 𒌚𒄞 – 'Month of the Blossoming'	Iyar אִיָּיר	Ayar ࡀࡉࡀࡓ	Ayyār أَيَّار	Apr/May
3	𒌚𒋞𒄷𒋛𒊒𒁀𒂷𒃻 ^{ITI}SIG_{4}.U_{5}.ŠUB.BA.GÁ.GAR – 'Month the brick is placed in the mold'	Araḫ Simanu – 𒌚𒋞	Sivan סִיוָן	Siwan ࡎࡉࡅࡀࡍ	Ḥazīrān حَزِيرَان	May/Jun
4	𒌚𒋗𒆰 ^{ITI}ŠU.NUMUN – 'Month of preparing for seed, festival'	Araḫ Dumuzu – 𒌚𒋗 'Month of Tammuz'	Tammuz תַּמּוּז	Tamuz/Tammuz ࡕࡀࡌࡅࡆ	Tammūz تَمُّوز	Jun/Jul
5	𒌚𒉈𒉈𒃻 ^{ITI}NE.IZI.GAR – 'Month when the braziers are lit'	Araḫ Abu – 𒌚𒉈	Av (month) אָב	Ab ࡀࡁ	Āb آب	Jul/Aug
6	𒌚𒆥𒀭𒈹 ^{ITI}KIN.^{d}INANNA – 'Month of the rectification of Inanna'	Araḫ Ulūlu – 𒌚𒆥	Elul אֱלוּל	Aylul ࡀࡉࡋࡅࡋ	Aylūl أَيْلُول	Aug/Sep
7	𒌚𒇯𒆬 ^{ITI}DU_{6}.KÙ – 'Month of the Sacred Mound'	Araḫ Tišritum – 𒌚𒇯 'Month of Beginning' (i.e. the start of the second half-year)	Tishrei תִּשְׁרֵי	Tišrin ࡕࡉࡔࡓࡉࡍ	Tishrīn al-Awwal تِشْرِين الْأَوَّل	Sep/Oct
8	𒌚(𒄑)𒀳𒂃𒀀 ^{ITI(GIŠ)}APIN.DU_{8}.A – 'Month the plow is let go'	Araḫ Samnu – 𒌚𒀳 'Month the Eighth'	Cheshvan מַרְחֶשְׁוָן/חֶשְׁוָן	Mašrwan ࡌࡀࡔࡓࡅࡀࡍ	Tishrīn ath-Thānī تِشْرِين الثَّانِي	Oct/Nov
9	𒌚𒃶𒃶(𒈬)𒌓𒁺 ^{ITI}GAN.GAN.(MU.)E_{3} – 'Month when the clouds(?) come out'	Araḫ Kislimu – 𒌚𒃶	Kislev כִּסְלֵו	Kanun ࡊࡀࡍࡅࡍ	Kānūn al-Awwal كَانُون الْأَوَّل	Nov/Dec
10	𒌚𒀊𒌓𒁺 ^{ITI}AB.E_{3} – 'Month of the father'	Araḫ Ṭebētum – 𒌚𒀊 'Muddy Month'	Tebeth טֵבֵת	Ṭabit ࡈࡀࡁࡉࡕ	Kānūn ath-Thānī كَانُون الثَّانِي	Dec/Jan
11	𒌚𒍩𒀀 ^{ITI}ZIZ_{2}.A – 'Month for emmer'	Araḫ Šabaṭu – 𒌚𒍩	Shevat שְׁבָט	Šabaṭ ࡔࡀࡁࡀࡈ	Shubāṭ شُبَاط	Jan/Feb
12	𒌚𒊺𒆥𒋻 ^{ITI}ŠE.KIN.KU_{5} – 'Month of the cutting of corn, harvest month'	Araḫ Addaru / Adār – 𒌚𒊺	Adar אֲדָר (אֲדָר א׳/אֲדָר רִאשׁון if there is an intercalary month that year)	Adar ࡀࡃࡀࡓ	Ādhār آذَار	Feb/Mar
13	𒌚𒋛𒀀𒊺𒆥𒋻 ^{ITI}DIRI.ŠE.KIN.KU_{5} – 'Additional harvest month'	Araḫ Makaruša Addari Araḫ Addaru Arku – 𒌚𒋛𒀀𒊺	Adar II אֲדָר ב׳/אֲדָר שֵׁנִי		Mart (Âzâr)	

== Accuracy ==
As a lunisolar calendar, the civil calendar aimed to keep calendar months in sync with the synodic month and calendar years in sync with the tropical year. Since new months of the civil calendar were declared by observing the crescent moon, the calendar months could not drift from the synodic month. On the other hand, since the length of a calendar year was handled by the Metonic cycle starting after 499 BCE, there is some inherent drift present in the formulaic computation of the new year when compared to the true new year. While on any given year the first day of the first month could be up to 20 days off from the vernal equinox, on average the length of a year was very well approximated by the Metonic cycle; the computed average length is within 30 minutes of the true solar year length.

== Administrative calendar ==
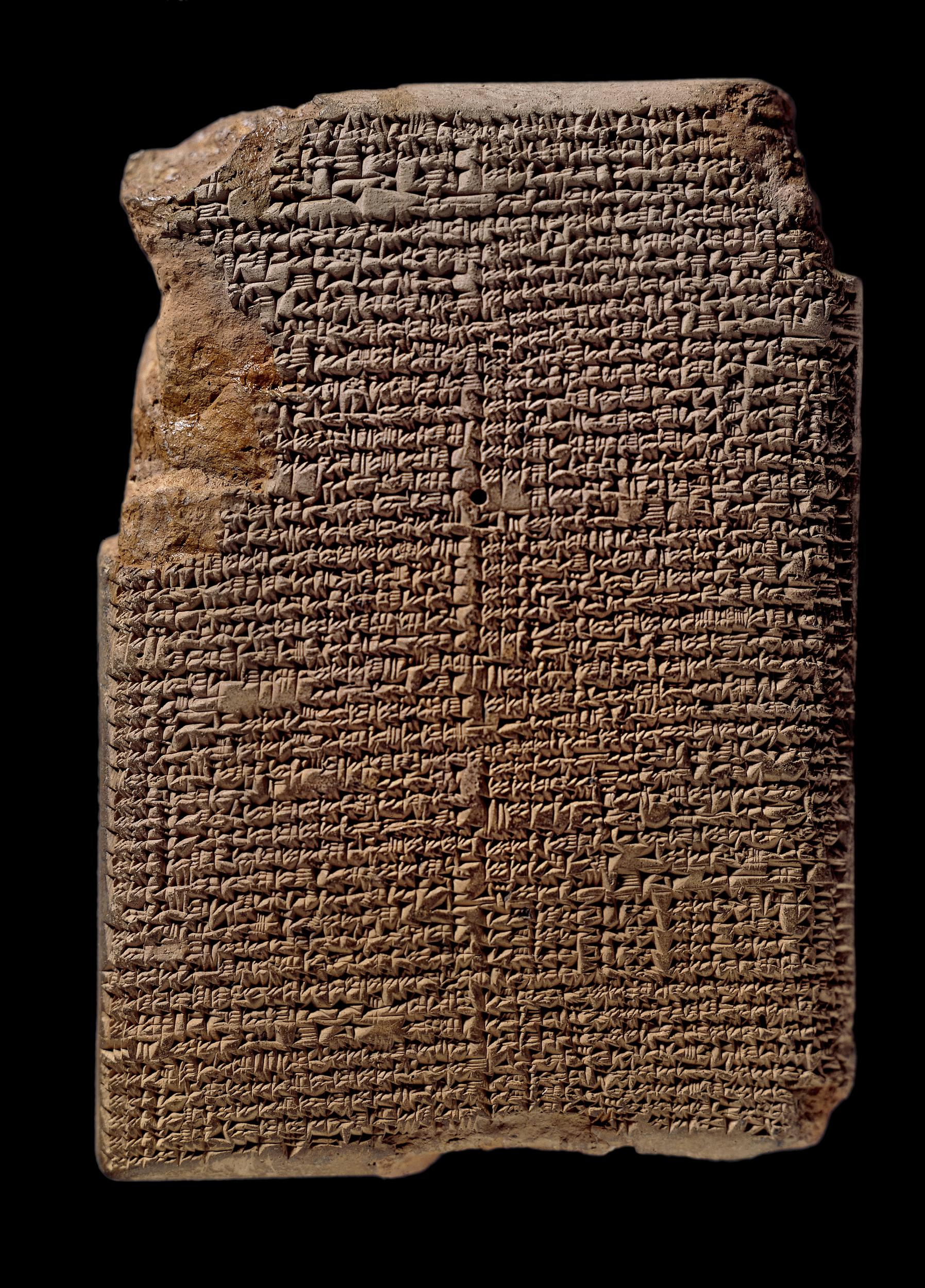
The MUL.APIN, which details guidelines for intercalation in the civil calendar and calculation of new moons using the administrative calendar.

Since the civil calendar was not standardized and predictable for at least the first millennium of its use, a second calendar system thrived in Babylon during the same time spans, known today as the administrative or schematic calendar. The administrative year consisted of 12 months of exactly 30 days each. In the 4th and 3rd millennia BCE, extra months were occasionally intercalated (in which case the year is 390 days), but by the beginning of the 2nd millennium BCE it did not make any intercalations or modifications to the 360-day year. This calendar saw use in areas requiring precision in dates or long-term planning; there is tablet evidence demonstrating it was used to date business transactions and astronomical observations, and that mathematics problems, wage calculations, and tax calculations all assumed the administrative calendar instead of the civil calendar.

Babylonian astronomers in particular made all astral calculations and predictions in terms of the administrative calendar. Discrepancies were accounted for in different ways according to the heavenly measurements being taken. When predicting the phase of the moon, it was treated as if each ideal month began with a new moon, even though this could not be true. In fact, this guideline appears in the MUL.APIN, which goes on further to specify that months that began "too early" (on the 30th of the previous month) were considered unlucky, and months that began "on time" (the day after the 30th of the previous month) were considered auspicious. When discussing the dates of equinoxes and solstices, the events were assigned fixed days of the administrative calendar, with shortening or lengthening of intervening days taking place to ensure that the celestial phenomena would fall on the "correct" day. Which fixed day each phenomenon was assigned varied throughout time, for one because which month was designated first varied throughout history. In general, they were assigned to the 15th day of four equally spaced months.

== Seven-day week and Sabbath ==
Counting from the new moon, the Babylonians celebrated every seventh day as a "holy-day", also called an "evil-day" (meaning "unsuitable" for prohibited activities). On these days officials were prohibited from various activities and common men were forbidden to "make a wish", and at least the 28th was known as a "rest-day". On each of them, offerings were made to a different god and goddess, apparently at nightfall to avoid the prohibitions: Marduk and Ishtar on the 7th, Ninlil and Nergal on the 14th, Sin and Shamash on the 21st, and Enki and Mah on the 28th. Tablets from the sixth-century BC reigns of Cyrus the Great and Cambyses II indicate these dates were sometimes approximate. The lunation of 29 or 30 days basically contained three seven-day weeks, and a final week of eight or nine days inclusive, breaking the continuous seven-day cycle.

Among other theories of Shabbat origin, the Universal Jewish Encyclopedia of Isaac Landman advanced a theory of Assyriologists like Friedrich Delitzsch that Shabbat originally arose from the lunar cycle, containing four weeks ending in Sabbath, plus one or two additional unreckoned days per month. The difficulties of this theory include reconciling the differences between an unbroken week and a lunar week, and explaining the absence of texts naming the lunar week as Shabbat in any language.

The rarely attested Sapattu^{m} or Sabattu^{m} as the full moon is cognate or merged with Hebrew Shabbat, but is monthly rather than weekly; it is regarded as a form of Sumerian sa-bat ("mid-rest"), attested in Akkadian as um nuh libbi ("day of mid-repose"). According to Marcello Craveri, Sabbath "was almost certainly derived from the Babylonian Shabattu, the festival of the full moon, but, all trace of any such origin having been lost, the Hebrews ascribed it to Biblical legend." This conclusion is a contextual restoration of the damaged Enûma Eliš creation account, which is read as: "[Sa]bbath shalt thou then encounter, mid[month]ly."

== Impact ==
The Akkadian names for months surface in a number of calendars still used today. In Iraq and the Levant, the solar Gregorian calendar system is used, with Classical Arabic names replacing the Roman ones, and the month names in the Assyrian calendar descend directly from the Aramaic ones, which descended from the Akkadian ones. Similarly, while Turkey uses the Gregorian calendar in the present day, the names of Turkish months were inspired by the 1839 Rumi calendar of the Ottoman Empire, itself derived from the Ottoman fiscal calendar of 1677 based on the Julian calendar. This last calendar month names of both Syriac and Islamic origin, and in the modern calendar four of these names descend from the original Akkadian names.

== See also ==
Today (at UTC+00)
- Sunday, 1 November 2026
- Babylonian: 19 Tashritu, 2337 SE
Other calendars
Akan	Fokwasi
Armenian	14 Trē 1476
Aztec	Atlcahualo 10, 10 Calli
Balinese pawukon	Menga, Pasah, Sri, Paing, Tungleh, Redite of Sinta, Sri, Dangu, Sri
Bengali	16 Kartik, BS 1433
Chinese	Yin Earth Rabbit・Hairy Head Mansion; Fire Horse Year, Month 9, Day 23 (Shuangjiang, 6 days until Lidong)
Common Era	1 November 2026 CE
Coptic	22 Paopi, AM 1743
Egyptian	19 Phamenoth, 2775 NE
Ethiopian	22 Ṭeqemt, 2019 Amätä Məhrät
French Republican	Décade I, Décadi de Brumaire de l'Année 235 de la République
Gregorian	1 November, AD 2026
Hebrew	21 Cheshvan, AM 5787
Hindu	Punarvasu・Sādhya; Solar: 15 Kārtika, 1948 SE; Lunisolar: Saptamī, Kṛishna pakṣa of Āśvina, 2083 VE; Rāudra・5127 KY・1,872,880
Icelandic	Sunnudagur, 9 Gormánuður 2026
Islamic	20 Jumada al-awwal, AH 1448 (using tabular method)
ISO week date	2026-W44-7
Japanese	22 Nagatsuki, Reiwa 8 (Sōkō, 6 days until Rittō)
Julian	19 October, AD 2026 (AM 7535)
Julian day	2461346
Korean	22 Gaedal, 4359 DE
Maya	13.0.14.1.3; 16 Zac, 10 Akbal
Roman	ante diem XIV Kalendas Novembres, MMDCCLXXIX AUC
Solar Hijri	10 Aban, SH 1405
Tibetan	22 tha skar, me pho rta 2153 or 1772 or 1000

=== Lunisolar calendars ===
- Hebrew calendar
- Ancient Macedonian calendar

=== Other systems ===
- Assyrian calendar
- Mandaean calendar
- Persian calendar
- Islamic calendar
- Solar Hijri calendar
- Pre-Islamic Arabian calendar
- Babylonian astrology
- Babylonian astronomy
- Arabic names of Gregorian months
- MUL.APIN
- Egyptian, Coptic, and Ethiopian calendars
- Zoroastrian and Armenian calendars
- Turkish months
