= Umm al-Qura =

Umm al-Qura or Um al-Qura (Arabic for "Mother of All Villages") may refer to:

- Mecca, a city in Saudi Arabia
  - Umm al-Qura calendar, an Islamic calendar in Saudi Arabia based on astronomical calculations
  - Umm al-Qura University, Mecca, Saudi Arabia
  - Umm Al-Qura (newspaper), official gazette of Saudi Arabia, first Arabic daily in the country
- Umm al-Qura Mosque, Baghdad, Iraq
- Umm al-Qura Mosque, in Muridke, Punjab, Pakistan
- Theory of Umm al-Qura, theory of power in the Islamic world, part of Iranian foreign policy
