= Arabic names of Gregorian months =

The Arabic names of the months of the Gregorian calendar are usually phonetic Arabic pronunciations of the corresponding month names used in European languages, or in the case of the Gulf Countries and Jordan, their numbers. A main regional exception is the Assyrian calendar names used in Iraq and the Levant, whose month names are inherited via Classical Arabic from the Babylonian and Aramaic lunisolar calendars and correspond to roughly the same time of year.

Though the lunar Hijri calendar and solar Hijri calendar are prominent in the Middle East, the Gregorian calendar is and has been used in nearly all the countries of the Arab world, in many places long before European occupation. All Arab states use the Gregorian calendar for civil purposes. The names of the Gregorian months as used in Egypt, Sudan, and Yemen are widely regarded as standard across the Arab world, although their Classical Arabic names are often used alongside them. In other Arab countries, some modification or actual changes in naming or pronunciation of months are observed.

== Iraq and the Levant ==
These names are used primarily in Iraq, Syria, Jordan, Lebanon and Palestine. Classical Arabic inherited the Aramaic names from the Babylonian and Assyrian calendars, which are lunisolar. Although the Arabic names are cognate, they do not refer to the lunar months, but rather name the Julian calendar months (and also Gregorian) of the Greek Orthodox liturgical calendar, which serves as a guide post for the old agricultural calendar. Nine of these names were also used in the Ottoman Turkish calendar, of which five remain in use in the modern Turkish calendar.

No.	Month	Arabic name	Transliteration	Syriac cognate	Transliteration
1	January	كانُون الثانِي	Kānūn aṯ-Ṯānī	ܟܢܘܢ ܒ	Kānōn [ʾ]Ḥrāy
2	February	شُباط	Šubāṭ	ܫܒܛ	Šḇāṭ
3	March	آذار	ʾĀḏār	ܐܕܪ	ʾĀḏar
4	April	نَيْسان	Naysān	ܢܝܣܢ	Nīsān
5	May	أَيّار	ʾAyyār	ܐܝܪ	ʾĪyār
6	June	حَزِيران	Ḥazīrān	ܚܙܝܪܢ	Ḥzīrān
7	July	تَمُّوز	Tammūz	ܬܡܘܙ	Tammūz
8	August	آب	ʾĀb	ܐܒ	ʾĀb/Ṭabbāḥ
9	September	أَيْلُول	ʾAylūl	ܐܝܠܘܠ	ʾĪlūl
10	October	تِشْرِين الْأَوَّل	Tišrīn al-ʾAwwal	ܬܫܪܝܢ ܐ	Tešrīn Qḏīm
11	November	تِشْرِين الثانِي	Tišrīn aṯ-Ṯānī	ܬܫܪܝܢ ܒ	Tešrīn [ʾ]Ḥrāy
12	December	كانُون الْأَوَّل	Kānūn al-ʾAwwal	ܟܢܘܢ ܐ	Kānōn Qḏīm

== Egypt, Libya, Sudan, and the Gulf ==
The names of the Gregorian months in Egypt, Sudan and the Gulf are based on the old Latin names.

No.	Month	Arabic name	Transliteration	Latin name	Egyptian pronunciation
1	January	يَنايِر	Yanāyir	Ianuarius	[jæ'næːjeɾ]
2	February	فِبْرايِر	Fibrāyir	Februarius	[febˈɾɑːjeɾ]
3	March	مارِس	Mārs/Māris	Martius	[ˈmæːɾes]
4	April	أَبْرِيل / إبْرِيل	ʾAbrīl / ʾIbrīl	Aprilis	[ʔɪbˈɾiːl, ʔæb-]
5	May	مايُو	Māyū	Maius	[ˈmæːju]
6	June	يُونِيُو / يُونِية	Yūniyū / Yūnyah	Iunius	[ˈjonjæ, -jo]
7	July	يُولِيُو / يُولِية	Yūliyū / Yūliyah	Iulius	[ˈjoljæ, -ju]
8	August	أَغُسْطُس	ʾAğusṭus	Augustus	[ʔɑˈɣostˤos, ʔoˈ-]
9	September	سِبْتَمْبَر	Sibtambar	September	[sebˈtæmbeɾ, -ˈtem-, -ˈtɑm-]
10	October	أُكْتُوبَر	ʾUktūbar	October	[okˈtoːbɑɾ, ek-, ɑk-]
11	November	نُوفَمْبَر / نُوَنْبِر	Nūfambar / Nuwanbar	November	[noˈvæmbeɾ, -ˈvem-, -ˈfæm-, -ˈfem-, -ˈvɑm-, -ˈfɑm-, -ˈwem-, -ˈwæm-, -ˈwɑm-]
12	December	دِيسَمْبَر	Dīsambar	December	[deˈsæmbeɾ, -ˈsem-, -ˈsɑm-]

=== Libya (1969–2011) ===
The names of months used in the Great Socialist People's Libyan Arab Jamahiriya (1977–2011) were derived from various sources, and were assembled after Muammar Gaddafi's seizure of power in 1969 and abolished in 2011 after the 17 February Revolution. The decision of changing calendar names was adopted in June 1986. The Libyan calendar, which followed the same sequence of renamed Gregorian months, counted the years from the death of Prophet Muhammad. This reckoning was therefore ten years behind the Solar Hijri calendar used in Iran and Afghanistan.

No.	Month	Arabic name	Transliteration	Meaning
1	January	أَيّ النار	Ayy an-Nār	that of the fires
2	February	النُوّار	an-Nuwwār	the blooming
3	March	الرَبِيع	ar-Rabīʿ	the spring
3	March	al-Mirrij was also used		
4	April	الطَيْر	aṭ-Ṭayr	the bird
5	May	الماء	al-Māʾ	the water
6	June	الصَيْف	aṣ-Ṣayf	the summer
7	July	ناصِر	Nāṣir	from Gamal Abd el-Nasser
8	August	هانِيبال	Hānībāl	from Hannibal Barca
9	September	الفاتِح	al-Fātiḥ	referring to al-Fateh Revolution
10	October	التُمُور / الثُمُور	at-Tumūr / aṯ-Ṯumūr	the dates
11	November	الحَرْث	al-Ḥarṯ	the tillage
12	December	الكانُون	al-Kānūn	the canon

== Algeria and Tunisia ==
The names of the Gregorian months in Algeria and Tunisia are based on the French names of the months, reflecting France's long colonisation of these countries (1830–1962 in Algeria; 1881–1956 in Tunisia).

No.	Month	Arabic name	Transliteration	French name
1	January	جانْفِي	Jānvi	janvier
2	February	فِيفْرِي	Fīvri	février
3	March	مارْس	Mārs / Māris	mars
4	April	أفْرِيل	ʾAvrīl	avril
5	May	ماي	Mēy	mai
6	June	جْوان	Jwān	juin
7	July	جْوِيلِْية	Jwīlya	juillet
8	August	أُوت	ʾŪt	août
9	September	سِبْتُمْبر	Septōmbr	septembre
10	October	أُكْتُوبر	ʾOktōbr	octobre
11	November	نُوفُمْبر	Novōmbr	novembre
12	December	دِيسُمْبر	Desōmbr	décembre

== Morocco ==
As Morocco was long part of the Roman Empire, the long-standing agricultural Berber calendar of the country preserves the Julian calendar and (in modified form) the names of its months. There are regional variations of the Berber calendar, since some communities did not recognise the Julian 29 February in century years where the Gregorian calendar had no equivalent date. When Morocco adopted the Gregorian calendar for civil purposes, the names of the months were taken from this local tradition.

No.	Month	Arabic name	Transliteration
1	January	يَنّايِر	Yannāyir
2	February	فِبْرايِر	Fibrāyir
3	March	مارْس	Mārs
4	April	إبْرِيل	ʾIbrīl
5	May	ماي	Māy
6	June	يُونِيُّو	Yūniyyū
7	July	يُولِيُّوز	Yūliyyūz
8	August	غُشْت	Ğušt
9	September	شُتَنْبِر	Šutanbir
10	October	أُكْتُوبِر	ʾUktūbir
11	November	نُوَنْبِر	Nuwanbir
12	December	دُجَنْبِر	Dujanbir

== See also ==
- Gregorian calendar
- Islamic calendar
- Solar Hijri calendar
- Assyrian calendar
- Hebrew calendar
- Iranian calendars
- Babylonian calendar
- Pre-Islamic Arabian calendar
- Rumi calendar
