= Rumi calendar =

Ottoman civil calendar (1839–1926)

The Rumi calendar (Ottoman Turkish: رومی تقویم, Rumi takvim, lit. "Roman calendar"), a specific calendar based on the Julian calendar, was officially used by the Ottoman Empire after Tanzimat (1839) and by its successor, the Republic of Turkey until 1926. It was adopted for civic matters and is a solar based calendar, assigning a date to each solar day.

== History ==
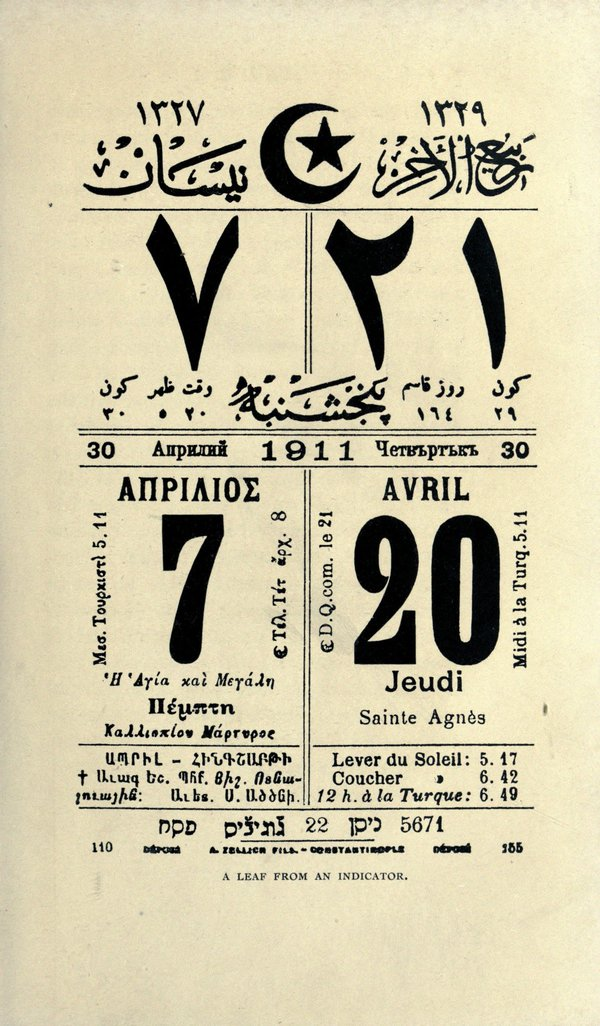
1911 multilingual Ottoman calendar page: The upper left shows the Rumi date in Ottoman Turkish: year 1327, 7 Nisan (٧ نیسان ١٣٢٧); The same Julian date (7 April, ΑΠΡΙΛΙΟΣ 7) and day (Thursday, Πέμπτη) appears below in Greek with the AD year 1911; Next to that is the Gregorian date (20 April, AVRIL 20) and day (Jeudi) in French; Above these two is 30 (twice), the number of days in the Julian and Gregorian months; the month (April, Априлий) and day (Thursday, Четвъртъкъ) in Bulgarian; Under the Greek is Armenian, reading April (ԱՊՐԻԼ) and Thursday (ՀԻՆԳՇԱԲԹԻ); The upper right shows the Islamic date 21 Rebiülahir 1329 (٢١ ربيع الآخر ١٣٢٩); The Hebrew date 22 Nisan 5671 (5671 ניסן 22) appears at the bottom.

In the Islamic state of the Ottoman Empire, the religious Islamic calendar (a lunar calendar) was in use. In this calendar, months coincide with lunar phases. Because a "lunar year" (the combined duration of twelve lunar phases) is shorter than the solar year, the seasons cycle through the lunar months as the solar years pass. As the Astronomical Almanac states: "As a result, the cycle of twelve lunar months regresses through the seasons over a period of about 33 [solar] years". (Note: This means that there are 34 Hijri years to 33 Gregorian years.)

=== 1677 introduction of the fiscal calendar ===
In 1677, Head Treasurer (Ottoman Turkish: باش دفتردار, Baş Defterdar) Hasan Pasha under Sultan Mehmed IV proposed the correction of financial records by dropping one year (an escape year) every 33 years, resulting from the difference between the lunar Islamic calendar and the solar Julian calendar.

In 1740 (1152 AH) during the reign of Sultan Mahmud I, March was adopted as the first month of the fiscal year for the payment of taxes and dealings with government officials (instead of Muharram), following Treasurer Atıf Efendi's proposal.

Proposed by Treasurer Moralı Osman Efendi during the reign of Sultan Abdul Hamid I, the range of the fiscal calendar applications was extended in 1794 to state expenditures and payments in order to prevent surplus cost arising from the difference in year length between the Islamic and Julian calendar.

=== 1840 adoption of the Julian calendar ===
The Julian calendar, used from 1677 AD on for fiscal matters only, was adopted on March 13, 1840 AD (March 1, 1256 AH), in the frame of Tanzimat reforms shortly after the accession to the throne of Sultan Abdülmecid I, as the official calendar for all civic matters and named "Rumi calendar" (literally Roman calendar). The counting of years began with the year 622 AD, when Muhammad and his followers emigrated from Mecca to Medina, the same event marking the start of the Islamic calendar. The months and days of the Julian calendar were used, the year starting in March. However, in 1256 AH the difference between the Hijri and the Gregorian calendars amounted to 584 years. With the change from lunar calendar to solar calendar, the difference between the Rumi calendar and the Julian or Gregorian calendar remained a constant 584 years.

=== 1917 Adoption of the Gregorian calendar ===
Since the Julian to Gregorian calendar changeover was finally being adopted in neighboring countries, the Rumi calendar was realigned to the Gregorian calendar in February 1917, leaving the difference of 584 years unchanged, however. Thus, after February 15, 1332 AH (28 February 1917 AD), the next day instead of being February 16 suddenly became March 1, 1333 AH (March 1, 1917 AD). The year 1333 AH (1917 AD) was made into a year with only ten months, running from March 1 to December 31. January 1, AD 1918 thus became January 1, AH 1334. The Rumi calendar remained in use after the dissolution of the Ottoman Empire into the first years of the succeeding Republic of Turkey.

=== 1925 discontinuation of the Rumi calendar ===
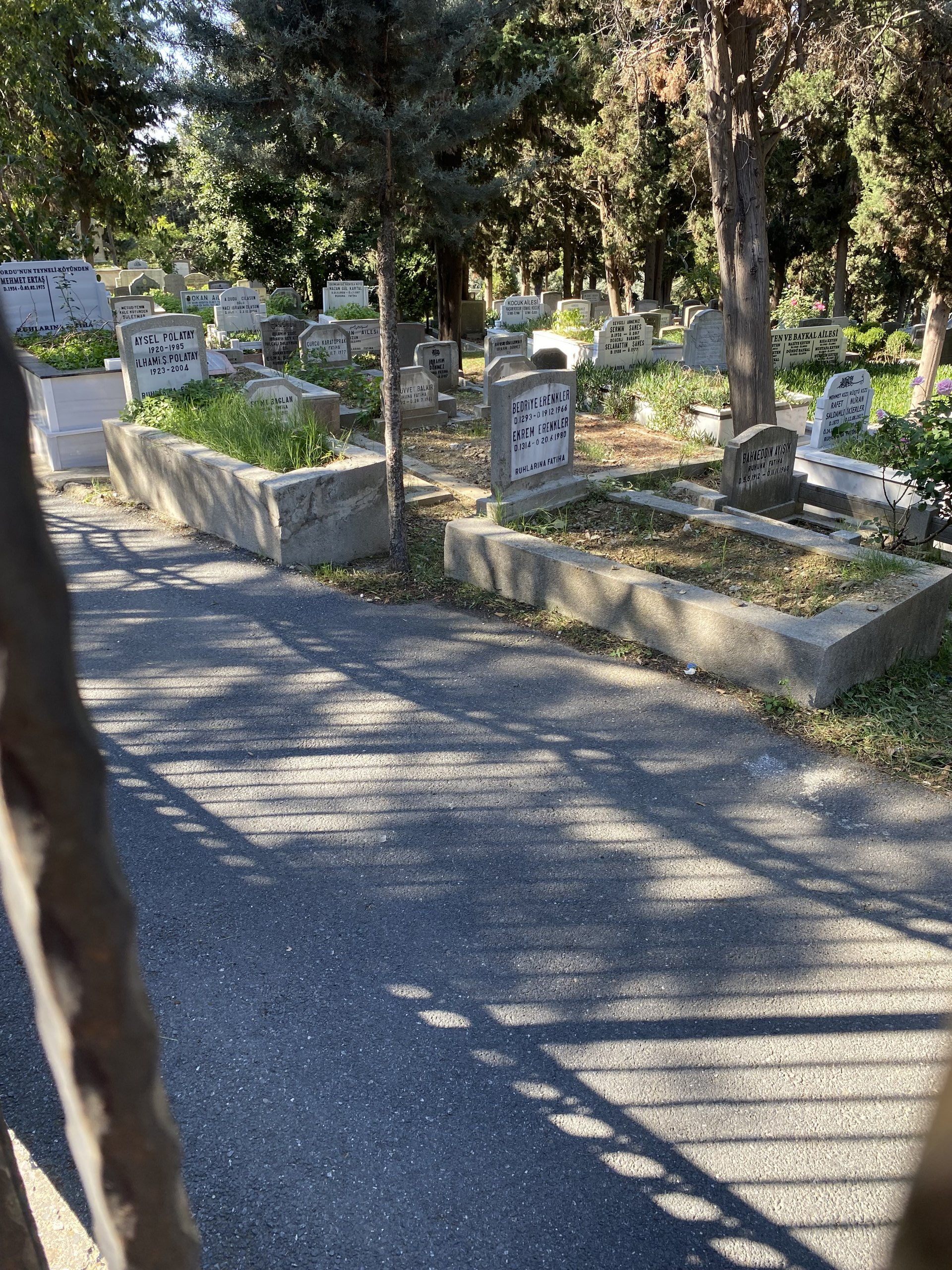
Gravestones at Feriköy Cemetery in Istanbul with Hijri birth years and Gregorian death dates. In the foreground, Bedriye Erenkler was born in 1293 AH (1876/77 CE) and died 19 December 1966 CE

The use of the AH era was abandoned as part of Atatürk's reforms by an act of December 26, 1341 AH (1925 AD) and was replaced by the Gregorian year from 1926. The transition is visible in material culture: gravestones from the early Republican era commonly display birth years according to the Hijri calendar, alongside death dates according to the Gregorian calendar, reflecting the shift between the two systems.

== Calendar months ==
The names of four months that occur in pairs in the Semitic/Arabic naming system (Teşrin-i Evvel, Teşrin-i Sânî and Kânûn-ı Evvel, Kânûn-ı Sânî) were changed on January 10, 1945 to Turkish language names, Ekim, Kasım, Aralık and Ocak, for simplicity. From 1918 the fiscal year has commenced on 1 January. The other months' names were from the Syriac language, except for Mart, Mayıs, and Ağustos, which were derived from Latin.

Rumî calendar months
Month	Fiscal year	Turkish	Ottoman	Days	Notes
1	11th month	Kânûn-ı Sânî	كانون ثانی	31	İkinci Kânûn (2nd Kânûn)
2	12th month	Şubat	شباط	28 or 29	
3	1st month	Mart	مارت	31	
4	2nd month	Nisan	نیسان	30	
5	3rd month	Mayıs	مایس	31	
6	4th month	Haziran	حزیران	30	
7	5th month	Temmuz	تموز	31	
8	6th month	Ağustos	اغستوس	31	
9	7th month	Eylül	ایلول	30	
10	8th month	Teşrin-i Evvel	تشرین اول	31	Birinci Teşrin (1st Teşrin)
11	9th month	Teşrin-i Sânî	تشرین ثانی	30	İkinci Teşrin (2nd Teşrin)
12	10th month	Kânûn-ı Evvel	كانون اول	31	Birinci Kânûn (1st Kânûn)

== 1917 conversion table ==
In 1917 (1332–1333), a major calendar reform aligned the Rumi calendar with the Gregorian calendar. This table, adapted from the work of Richard B. Rose, lists the equivalent dates for that year.

Ottoman fiscal calendar	Gregorian calendar	Julian calendar	Hijri calendar
Teşrin-i Sânî 1–30, 1332	Nov 14 – Dec 13, 1916	Nov 1–30, 1916	Muharram 18 – Safar 17, 1335
Kânûn-ı Evvel 1–31	Dec 14, 1916 – Jan 13, 1917	Dec 1–31, 1916	Safar 18 – Rabi' al-Awwal 19
Kânûn-ı Sânî 1–31	Jan 14 – Feb 13, 1917	Jan 1–30, 1917	Rabi' al-Awwal 20 – Rabi' al-Thani 19
Şubat 1–13	Feb 14–26	Feb 1–13	Rabi' al-Thani 20 – Jumada al-Awwal 3
Şubat 14	Feb 27	Feb 14	Jumada al-Awwal 4
Şubat 15	Feb 28	Feb 15	Jumada al-Awwal 5
Mart 1, 1333	Mar 1	Feb 16	Jumada al-Awwal 6
Mart 2	Mar 2	Feb 17	Jumada al-Awwal 7
Mart 3	Mar 3	Feb 18	Jumada al-Awwal 8
Mart 4–13	Mar 4–13	Feb 19–28	Jumada al-Awwal 9–18
Mart 14–31	Mar 14–31	Mar 1–18	Jumada al-Awwal 19 – Jumada al-Thani 6
Nisan 1–30	April 1–30	Mar 19 – Apr 17	Jumada al-Thani 7 – Rajab 7
Mayıs 1–31	May 1-31	Apr 18 – May 18	Rajab 8 – Sha'ban 8
Haziran 1-30	Jun 1–30	May 19 – Jun 17	Sha'ban 9 – Ramadan 9
Temmuz 1–31	Jul 1–31	Jun 18 – Jul 18	Ramadan 10–Shawwal 10
Ağustos 1–31	Aug 1–31	Jul 19 – Aug 18	Shawwal 11 – Dhu al-Qa'dah 12
Eylül 1–30	Sep 1–30	Aug 19 – Sep 17	Dhu al-Qa'dah 13 – Dhu al-Hijja 12
Teşrin-i Evvel 1–31	Oct 1-31	Sep 18 – Oct 18	Dhu al-Hijja 13 – Muharram 14, 1336
Teşrin-i Sânî 1–30	Nov 1–30	Oct 19 – Nov 17	Muharram 15 – Safar 14
Kânûn-ı Evvel 1–31	Dec 1–31	Nov 18 – Dec 18	Safar 15 – Rabi' al–Awwal 16
Kânûn-ı Sânî 1–31, 1334	Jan 1–31, 1918	Dec 19, 1917 – Jan 18, 1918	Rabi' al-Awwal 17 – Rabi' al-Thani 17
Şubat 1–28	Feb 1 – 28	Jan 19 – Feb 16	Rabi' al-Thani 18 – Jumada al-Awwal 16

== See also ==
- List of calendars
  - Islamic calendar
  - Solar Hijri calendar
  - Tabarian calendar
  - Assyrian calendar
  - Hebrew calendar
  - Persian calendar
  - Babylonian calendar
  - Pre-Islamic Arabian calendar
- Arabic names of Gregorian months
