= Marcello Craveri =

Italian biblical scholar

Marcello Craveri (23 March 1914 – 18 February 2002) was an Italian biblical scholar. Born in Turin, he earned his doctorate in 1940 and then saw military service.

His most widely read work probably is The Life of Jesus published in 1966, and in paperback English translation in 1967. On the biblical evidence, and the then-available evidence from the Dead Sea Scrolls, Craveri concluded that the claims to divinity made by the historical Jesus were strictly limited and not unusual for a Jew of that generation. Much of the stronger claims, and the emphasis on the redeeming power of Christ's death on the Cross, could be seen as reworkings by St. Paul, who was probably influenced strongly by the Graeco-Roman traditions.

== Biography ==
A student of Ambrogio Donini, he became known for his treatment of religious themes and traditions through a Marxist and social perspective. His best-known work is probably The Life of Jesus, published in 1966 and reprinted several times. Based on what he deduced from the biblical texts and the Dead Sea Scrolls, Craveri concluded that the claims of divinity by the Historical Jesus were strictly limited and not unusual for a Jew of his time. Much of the strongest claims, and the emphasis regarding the saving power of Christ's death on the cross, could be reconsidered as a reworking of Paul the Apostle, who, according to the author, was heavily influenced by Greco-Roman traditions.

Craveri died on February 18, 2002, and is buried in Turin's Monumental Cemetery.

== Bibliography ==
- Craveri, M (English translation 1967) The Life of Jesus; An assessment through modern historical evidence. Panther History
- Craveri, M (1967) The Life of Jesus, Grove Press [translation of: La vita di Gesù, Feltrinelli Editore, Milano (1966)] https://www.amazon.com/Life-Jesus-Marcello-Craveri/dp/0880012382/
- Mention of Marcello Craveri's death (in Italian)
