= Calendars in pre-Islamic Arabia =

Pre-Islamic Arabia was a home to many calendars, mostly known from inscriptions. Calendars often varied by region, and cities or kingdoms often used a lunar calendar, a lunisolar calendar, and much more rarely, a solar calendar. Lunisolar calendars used the lunar phases of the moon to count months and the rotation of the earth around the sun to count years. Because twelve lunar months are 11–12 days shorter than a solar year, lunisolar calendars used intercalation to synchronize the months with the seasons and years.

Across Arabia, three main calendrical traditions have been discovered: the northern Arabian tradition, the tradition of the Najran oasis, and that of South Arabia more broadly. Inscriptions of the ancient South Arabian calendars reveal the use of a number of local calendars, as do Safaitic inscriptions from the Harran desert in Syria and Jordan. At least some of the South Arabian calendars followed the lunisolar system, while the Safaitic calendar had fixed months and seasons and, very importantly, a seasonal star calendar strongly connected to the Zodiac and the position of the ʔanwāʔ. The ʔanwāʔ, a series of asterisms on or near the zodiac belt were the most important element in pre-Islamic astronomy. These stars were connected to the season, and they were used to forecast various phenomena such as rain, temperature, wind.

After the Roman conquest of the Nabataean Kingdom, the newly created province of Arabia Petraea kept its old calendar, but began counting years according to the Era Provincia Arabia, or the Bostran era, which begins in 106 AD (the date of the conquest). This was an unusual combination, since the north Arabia used a lunar calendar system, while the Romans used a solar calendar system, though this combination is not unattested.

Little epigraphic evidence exists for the Meccan calendar outside of Abbasid-era Muslim tradition. Some historians maintain that it was a purely lunar calendar, similar to the modern Islamic calendar, whereas others believe that this was true only until the two centuries before the Hijra, when it became a lunisolar calendar with an intercalary month.

== Calendar used by region ==
Epigraphic evidence shows that calendars in pre-Islamic Arabia were not uniform but followed several regional traditions. Christian J. Robin identifies three main calendrical systems attested in inscriptions: those of northern Arabia, the Najran region, and South Arabia, each combining lunar months with different approaches to year reckoning and intercalation.

=== Northern Arabia ===
In northern Arabia, especially the northwestern Hejaz, inscriptions attest the use of the Nabataean calendar, which was derived from the Babylonian calendar. This calendar was lunar in structure and employed intercalation to keep the months aligned with the seasons. Month names correspond to Babylonian originals, indicating a Nabataean adoption of an established Near Eastern lunisolar model.

After the Roman annexation of the Nabataean Kingdom in 106 AD, and the establishment of Arabia Petraea (the Roman province of Arabia) over this region, years began to be counted according to the Arabian era, whose first year corresponds to 106 AD (the date of the creation of the province).

=== Najran region ===
In the oasis of Najran, inscriptions show a similar combination of lunar months with the use of the Roman provincial era. Alongside this, Robin identifies a distinct calendar, that he names the al-muʾtamir-burak calendar, after the names of its first and last months.

This calendar is known from epigraphic evidence and later Arabic scholarly tradition and appears to have been lunar, with intercalation used to reconcile lunar months with solar years.

=== South Arabia ===
In South Arabia, each major and minor kingdom maintained its own calendar, but these shared a common structural framework. Earlier calendars followed the Sabaean model, while later ones were aligned with that of Himyar. The Sabaean calendar was most likely lunar with intercalary corrections, closely based on the Babylonian system, and inscriptions explicitly attest the use of intercalary months.

The Himyarite calendar retained this basic structure, though evidence for intercalation is rare, with only a single attested example from the Himyarite period involving the doubling of a month. Religious change also influenced calendrical practice: the rise of Judaism in Himyar led to modifications in the calendar, and at a later stage the Himyarite calendar appears to have become fully solar.

=== Mecca ===
Robin's study of pre-Islamic Arabian calendars finds that Meccan calendar, prior to Muhammad, was a lunar calendar with regular corrections (the addition of intercalary months) to keep it in sync with the solar seasons. Robin finds that the structure of the Meccan calendar was based on the Himyarite calendar, as the two were structurally the same, including: (1) the use of a lunar calendar aided intercalation (2) the use of the same method for intercalation: repeating the first month of the year one time (3) the beginning of the year is around the spring equinox (4) use of the same date in the calendrical year for the major pilgrimage event (which, in South Arabia, was centred at the Temple of Awwam).

Robin believes that the Himyarite-style calendar was mediated into Mecca through Mudar, a major tribal confederation (with one member tribe being the Quraysh) that controlled large parts of the Hejaz, including Mecca. In the fifth century onwards, Mudar was dominated by Himyar.

== Naming system ==
=== Seasons and the Zodiac ===
In Safaitic inscriptions, both seasons and Zodiac signs are used to refer to specific times. Four different Safaitic seasons are documented: 'winter' s^{2}ty, which corresponds to early January-mid-February, 'the season of the later rains' dṯʔ, taking place in mid-February till mid-April, 'the early summer' ṣyf, lasting from mid-April till early June and finally the 'dry season' qyẓ, lasting from early June till early October. Rwala bedouins also have a similar system, although it is more complete, and includes aṣ-ṣferi, the fifth season, early October-early January, which is lacking from Safaitic attestations. Besides, they call dṯʔ as-smāk, which is from a different root. These Safaitic seasons can be seen in, for instance, Mu 113

l s ʿd bn ḍb bn ʿbd bn ʾdm w ḥll h- dr dṯʾ f ʾyḍ f s^{2}ty f h bʿls1mn qbll

"By Ṣʿd son of Ḍb son of ʿbd son of ʾdm and he camped here during the season of the later rains, then the dry season, and then winter so, O Bʿls^{1}mn, show benevolence" (Baʕl-Samān was the name of a Safaitic god).

These seasons were connected to Zodiac signs which, in any case, had a very important place in the pre-Islamic calendars, whether South Arabian or Safaitic. In many places these Zodiac signs are used to refer to specific past events. Below are cited the names of the pre-Islamic Safaitic Zodiac names (ḏ corresponds to voiced English th in the and ṯ to unvoiced English th in throngs), the list of which is incomplete as the word for Cancer is insecure):

Arabian astrological signs
Safaitic word	Meaning	Western correspondent
ḏkr	'ram'	Aries
ʔʔly	prob. from Akkadian alû 'bull of heaven'	Taurus
gml	'gemini', possibly from ğml (Ar. جملة 'aggregate, group') but rather from the word for 'camel' because the constellation looks like a camel	Gemini
ʔs^{1}d	'lion'	Leo
ngm	'seed produce'	Virgo
ʔmt	perhaps 'scale'	Libra
ʕqbt	'scorpio' (cf. Arabic ʕaqrab 'scorpio, Scorpio')	Scorpio
rmy or ṯbr	'archer' (rmy) or 'warrior' (ṯbr)	Sagittarius
yʔmr	'goat-fish' (cf. Akkadian suḫurmašu 'goat-fish')	Capricorn
mlḥ	either 'vessel for carrying salt' or 'salt-worker' (cf. Ar. milḥ 'salt' etc.)	Aquarius
ḏl or ḏyl	perhaps 'tails' (cf. Akkadian zibbātu 'tails' (of fish)	Pisces

As in some Safaitic texts, series of Zodiac signs correspond to (in other texts) the same series of months, denoting the same seasons of the year, it is obvious that the Arabian nomads from the desert did not use a 360-days calendar without intercalation, nor a purely lunar calendar, as otherwise Zodiac signs would not match the months and seasons. The mention of dṯʔ qyẓ s^{2}ty in Safaitic inscriptions, being a description of the whole year, corresponding to the often re-occurring phrase mlḥ w ḏkr w ʔmt "Aquarius and Aries and Libra", shows that the nomadic year started with the season of rains following the winter, namely dṯʔ (mid-February to mid-April), exactly like the South Arabian year. However, as Al-Jallad (2016: 86) argues, we would then expect the equivalent Zodiacal sequence to start with Aries, and not with Aquarius as it does (mlḥ w ḏkr w ʔmt). This is because the Safaitic Zodiac did not correspond to our notion of the Zodiac, but each sign started when the Sun entered the constellation, and in no way it is connected to a Lunar calendar where the Zodiac names simply could be equated to their corresponding month names.

=== Month names ===
Sources for the names of these pre-Islamic months are al-Muntakhab min Gharīb Kalām al-ʿArab by Ḥasan of Abū al-Ḥasan ʿAlīy bin al-Ḥasan bin al-Ḥusayn al-Hunāʾī ad-Dūsā (d. 309 A.H./921 C.E.), better known as "Kurāʿ an-Naml", and Lisān al-ʿArab of Ibn Manẓūr (d. 711 A.H./1311 C.E.). Al-Biruni and al-Mas'udi suggest that the Ancient Arabs used the same month names as the Muslims, though they also record other month names used by the pre-Islamic Arabs.

Number	Pre-Islamic	الشهور الجاهلية	Islamic	الشهور الإسلامية
1	muʾtamir or al-muʾtamir	مُؤْتَمِر / ٱلْمُؤْتَمِر	al-muḥarram	ٱلْمُحَرَّم
2	nājir	نَاجِر	ṣafar	صَفَر
3	khawwān or khuwwān	خَوَّان / خُوَّان	rabīʿ al-ʾawwal	رَبِيع ٱلْأَوَّل
4	wabṣān	وَبْصَان	rabīʿ al-ʾākhir or rabīʿ ath-thānī	رَبِيع ٱلْآخِر / رَبِيع ٱلثَّانِي
5	ḥanīn	حَنِين	jumādā al-ʾūlā	جُمَادَىٰ ٱلْأُولَىٰ
6	rubbā	رُبَّىٰ	jumādā al-ʾākhirah or jumādā ath-thāniyah	جُمَادَىٰ ٱلْآخِرَة / جُمَادَىٰ ٱلثَّانِيَة
7	al-ʾaṣamm or munṣil al-ʾasinnah or al-muḥarram	ٱلْأَصَمّ / مُنْصِل ٱلْأَسِنَّة / ٱلْمُحَرَّم	rajab	رَجَب
8	ʿāḏil	عَاذِل	shaʿbān	شَعْبَان
9	nātiq	نَاتِق	ramaḍān	رَمَضَان
10	waʿl or waʿil	وَعْل / وَعِل	shawwāl	شَوَّال
11	warnah	وَرْنَة	ḏū al-qaʿdah	ذُو ٱلْقَعْدَة
12	burak or maymūn	بُرَك / مَيْمُون	ḏū al-ḥijjah	ذُو ٱلْحِجَّة

Unlike the common Arabic usage of equating rabīʿ to the spring (so is its meaning in all modern Arabic dialects), Classical lexicographers translate it as 'autumn' and equate it to xarīf 'autumn'. We have thus the possibility to deduce the general position with the year of the following months, based on the assumption that rabīʿ al-ʾawwal designates, as its name indicates, early autumn.

=== Day names ===
The names for the days of the week in pre-Islamic Arabia were changed during the era of Islam to numbers ("the first (day)", "the second (day)", etc.) with the exception of the sixth day, "Friday", whose name means "congregation", in reference to this being the Islamic day of communal prayer. The numbering follows the account of the creation in six days, with the seventh the day of rest, in the creation narrative in the Book of Genesis. Prior to this, the pre-Islamic Arabian days of the week were:

Number	Pre-Islamic	الأيام الجاهلية	Islamic	الأيام الإسلامية
1	al-ʾawwal	ٱلْأَوَّل	al-ʾaḥad	ٱلْأَحَد
2	al-ʾahwan or al-ʾahuwan or al-ʾawhad	ٱلْأَهْوَن / ٱلْأَهُوَن / ٱلْأَوْهَد	al-ʾithnayn	ٱلْإِثْنَيْن
3	al-jubār	ٱلْجُبَار	ath-thulāthāʾ	ٱلثُّلَاثَاء
4	al-dubār or al-dibār	ٱلدُّبَار / ٱلدِّبَار	al-ʾarbiʿāʾ	ٱلْأَرْبِعَاء
5	al-muʾnis	ٱلْمُؤْنِس	al-khamīs	ٱلْخَمِيس
6	al-ʿarūbah	ٱلْعَرُوبَة	al-jumʿah	ٱلْجُمْعَة
7	ash-shiyār	ٱلشِّيَار	as-sabt	ٱلسَّبْت

== Sacred months ==
The Islamic tradition is unanimous in stating that Arabs of Tihamah, Hejaz, and Najd distinguished between two types of months, permitted (ḥalāl) and forbidden (ḥarām) months. The forbidden months were four months during which fighting is forbidden, listed as Rajab and the three months around the pilgrimage season, Dhu al-Qa‘dah, Dhu al-Hijjah, and Muharram. A similar if not identical concept to the forbidden months is also attested by Procopius, where he describes an armistice that the Eastern Arabs of the Lakhmid ruler, al-Mundhir II, respected for two months in the summer solstice of 541 AD/CE. However, Muslim historians do not link these months to a particular season.

== Intercalation ==
The Qur'an links the four forbidden months with Nasi' (Arabic: ٱلنَّسِيء, an-nasīʾ), a word that literally means "postponement". According to Muslim tradition, the decision of postponement was administered by the tribe of Kinanah, by a man known as the al-Qalammas of Kinanah and his descendants (pl. qalāmisa).

Different interpretations of the concept of Nasī’ have been proposed. Some scholars, both Muslim and Western, maintain that the pre-Islamic calendar used in Central Arabia was a purely lunar calendar similar to the modern Islamic calendar. According to this view, Nasī’ is related to the pre-Islamic practices of the Meccan Arabs, where they would alter the distribution of the forbidden months within a given year without implying a calendar manipulation. This interpretation is supported by Arab historians and lexicographers, like Ibn Hisham, Ibn Manzur, and the corpus of Qur'anic exegesis.

This is corroborated by an early Sabaic inscription, where a religious ritual was "postponed" (ns'’w) due to war. According to the context of this inscription, the verb ns'’ has nothing to do with intercalation, but only with moving religious events within the calendar itself. The similarity between the religious concept of this ancient inscription and the Qur'an suggests that non-calendaring postponement is also the Qur'anic meaning of Nasī’. Thus the Encyclopaedia of Islam concludes "The Arabic system of [Nasī’] can only have been intended to move the Hajj and the fairs associated with it in the vicinity of Mecca to a suitable season of the year. It was not intended to establish a fixed calendar to be generally observed."

Others concur that it was originally a lunar calendar, but suggest that about 200 years before the Hijra it was transformed into a lunisolar calendar containing an intercalary month added from time to time to keep the pilgrimage within the season of the year when merchandise was most abundant. This interpretation was first proposed by the medieval Muslim astrologer and astronomer Abu Ma'shar al-Balkhi, and later by al-Biruni, al-Mas'udi, and some Western scholars. This interpretation considers Nasī’ to be a synonym to the Arabic word for "intercalation" (kabīsa). The Arabs, according to one explanation mentioned by Abu Ma'shar, learned of this type of intercalation from the Jews. The Jewish Nasi was the official who decided when to intercalate the Jewish calendar. Some sources say that the Arabs followed the Jewish practice and intercalated seven months over nineteen years, or else that they intercalated nine months over 24 years; there is, however, no consensus among scholars on this issue. The metonic cycle of 19 years was established for intercalating the Hebrew calendar since the time of their exile in Babylonian, and it was also observed in the Babylonian calendar as well, starting in the same period. The Kinānah tribe, during the time of Muhammad, was in charge of authorizing the intercalation; that the Kinānah tribe had taken over this task from the Kinda tribe, which had been Judaized for hundreds of years previously, lends credence to the position that the process of intercalation may have been borrowed from the Jewish tradition.

Referring to Abū Rayḥān al-Bīrūnī (d. ca. 442 A.H./1050 C.E.), it has been posited that this intercalation was effected in order to accommodate the scheduling of seasonal trade cycles with annual pilgrimages.

== Calendars and divination ==
In pre-Islamic life, the position of the stars and the sun were important for timekeeping and ritual life. Before the rise of Islam, diviners invoked these stars in rainmaking rituals called istisqāʔ. Rituals took place during specific times, when the sun was in one or the other of these ʔanwāʔ, some Safaitic texts speak of ritual cleansing while the sun is in Virgo (ngm) or Sagittarius (ṯbr); another text mentions a libation during the full moon of Gemini (gml).

== See also ==
- Islamic calendar
- Solar Hijri calendar
- Assyrian calendar
- Persian calendar
- Rumi calendar
- Arabic names of Gregorian months
