= Islamic calendar =

Lunar calendar used by most Muslims

Today (at UTC+00)
- Tuesday, 17 November 2026
- Islamic: 6 Jumada al-thani, AH 1448 (using tabular method)
Other calendars
Akan	Kwabene
Armenian	30 Trē 1476
Aztec	Tlacaxipehualiztli 6, 13 Quiyahuitl
Babylonian	6 Arakhsamna, 2337 SE
Balinese pawukon	Menga, Beteng, Sri, Pon, Was, Anggara of Ukir, Sri, Ogan, Pandita
Bengali	2 Ogrohayon, BS 1433
Chinese	Yin Wood Goat・Tail Mansion; Fire Horse Year, Month 10, Day 9 (Lidong, 5 days until Xiaoxue)
Common Era	17 November 2026 CE
Coptic	8 Hathor, AM 1743
Egyptian	5 Pharmuthi, 2775 NE
Ethiopian	8 H̱edār, 2019 Amätä Məhrät
French Republican	Décade III, Sextidi de Brumaire de l'Année 235 de la République
Gregorian	17 November, AD 2026
Hebrew	7 Kislev, AM 5787
Hindu	Dhaniṣṭhā・Vṛddhi; Solar: 1 Mārgaśīrṣa, 1948 SE; Lunisolar: Aṣṭamī, Śukla pakṣa of Kārtika, 2083 VE; Rāudra・5127 KY・1,872,896
Icelandic	Þriðjudagur, 25 Gormánuður 2026
ISO week date	2026-W47-2
Japanese	9 Kannazuki, Reiwa 8 (Rittō, 5 days until Shōsetsu)
Julian	4 November, AD 2026 (AM 7535)
Julian day	2461362
Korean	9 Dwaejidal, 4359 DE
Maya	13.0.14.1.19; 12 Ceh, 13 Cauac
Roman	Pridie Nonas Novembres, MMDCCLXXIX AUC
Solar Hijri	26 Aban, SH 1405
Tibetan	8 smin drug, me pho rta 2153 or 1772 or 1000

The (lunar) Hijri calendar (Arabic: ٱلتَّقْوِيم ٱلْهِجْرِيّ, romanized: al-taqwīm al-hijrī), also known in English as the Islamic calendar, Muslim calendar or Arabic calendar, is a lunar calendar consisting of 12 lunar months in a year of 354 or 355 days. It is used to determine the dates of Islamic holidays and rituals, such as the annual fasting and the annual season for the great pilgrimage. In almost all countries where the predominant religion is Islam, the civil calendar is the Gregorian calendar, with Syriac month-names used in the Levant and Mesopotamia (Iraq, Syria, Jordan, Lebanon and Palestine), but the religious calendar is the Hijri one.

This calendar enumerates the Hijri era, whose epoch was established at the Islamic New Year in 622 CE. During that year, Muhammad and his followers migrated from Mecca to Medina and established the first Muslim community (ummah), an event commemorated as the Hijrah. Although the "Persian" solar Hijri calendar shares this epoch, it counts years of 365 or 366 days and is therefore currently 42–43 years behind. In the West, dates in this era are usually denoted AH (Latin: Anno Hegirae, lit. 'In the year of the Hijrah'). (Note: This notation is similar to that of AD for the Christian era, CE for the Common Era and AM for the Jewish era.) In Muslim countries, it is also sometimes denoted as H from its Arabic form (سَنَة هِجْرِيَّة, abbreviated ھ). In English, years prior to the Hijra are denoted as BH ("Before the Hijra").

Since 16 June 2026 CE, the current Islamic year is 1448 AH. In Gregorian calendar terms, 1448 AH runs to approximately 5 June 2027. (Note: Exact dates depend on which variant of the Islamic calendar is followed.)

== History ==
=== Pre-Islamic calendar ===
For central Arabia, especially Mecca, there is a lack of epigraphical evidence but details are found in the writings of Muslim authors of the Abbasid era. Inscriptions of the ancient South Arabian calendars reveal the use of a number of local calendars. Some of these South Arabian calendars followed a lunisolar system. Both al-Biruni and al-Mas'udi suggest that the ancient Arabs used the same month names as Muslims, though they also record other month names used by the pre-Islamic Arabs.

The Islamic tradition is unanimous in stating that Arabs of Tihamah, Hejaz, and Najd distinguished between two types of months, permitted (ḥalāl) and forbidden (ḥarām) months. The forbidden months were four months during which fighting is forbidden, listed as Rajab and the three months around the pilgrimage season, Dhu'l-Qa'da, Dhu'l-Hijja, and Muharram. A similar if not identical concept to the forbidden months is also attested by Procopius, where he describes an armistice that the Eastern Arabs of the Lakhmid al-Mundhir respected for two months in the summer solstice of 541 CE. However, Muslim historians do not link these months to a particular season. The Qur'an links the four forbidden months with Nasī', a word that literally means "postponement". According to Muslim tradition, the decision of postponement was administered by the tribe of Kinanah, by a man known as the al-Qalammas of Kinanah and his descendants (pl. qalāmisa).

Different interpretations of the concept of Nasī' have been proposed. Some scholars, both Muslim and Western, maintain that the pre-Islamic calendar used in central Arabia was a purely lunar calendar similar to the modern Islamic calendar. According to this view, Nasī' is related to the pre-Islamic practices of the Meccan Arabs, where they would alter the distribution of the forbidden months within a given year without implying a calendar manipulation. This interpretation is supported by Arab historians and lexicographers, such as Ibn Hisham, Ibn Manzur, and the corpus of Qur'anic exegesis.

This is corroborated by an early Sabaic inscription, where a religious ritual was "postponed" (ns'w) due to war. According to the context of this inscription, the verb ns'’ has nothing to do with intercalation, but only with moving religious events within the calendar itself. The similarity between the religious concept of this ancient inscription and the Qur'an suggests that non-calendaring postponement is also the Qur'anic meaning of Nasī'. The Encyclopaedia of Islam concludes "The Arabic system of [Nasī'] can only have been intended to move the Hajj and the fairs associated with it in the vicinity of Mecca to a suitable season of the year. It was not intended to establish a fixed calendar to be generally observed." The term "fixed calendar" is generally understood to refer to the non-intercalated calendar.

Others concur that it was originally a lunar calendar, but suggest that around 200 years before the Hijra it was transformed into a lunisolar calendar containing an intercalary month added from time to time to keep the pilgrimage within the season of the year when merchandise was most abundant. This interpretation was first proposed by the medieval Muslim astrologer and astronomer Abu Ma'shar al-Balkhi, and later by al-Biruni, al-Mas'udi, and some western scholars. This interpretation considers Nasī' to be a synonym to the Arabic word for "intercalation" (kabīsa). The Arabs, according to one explanation mentioned by Abu Ma'shar, learned of this type of intercalation from the Jews. The Jewish Nasi was the official who decided when to intercalate the Jewish calendar. Some sources state that the Arabs followed the Jewish practice and intercalated seven months over nineteen years, or else that they intercalated nine months over 24 years; there is, however, no consensus among scholars on this issue.

=== Prohibiting Nasī' ===
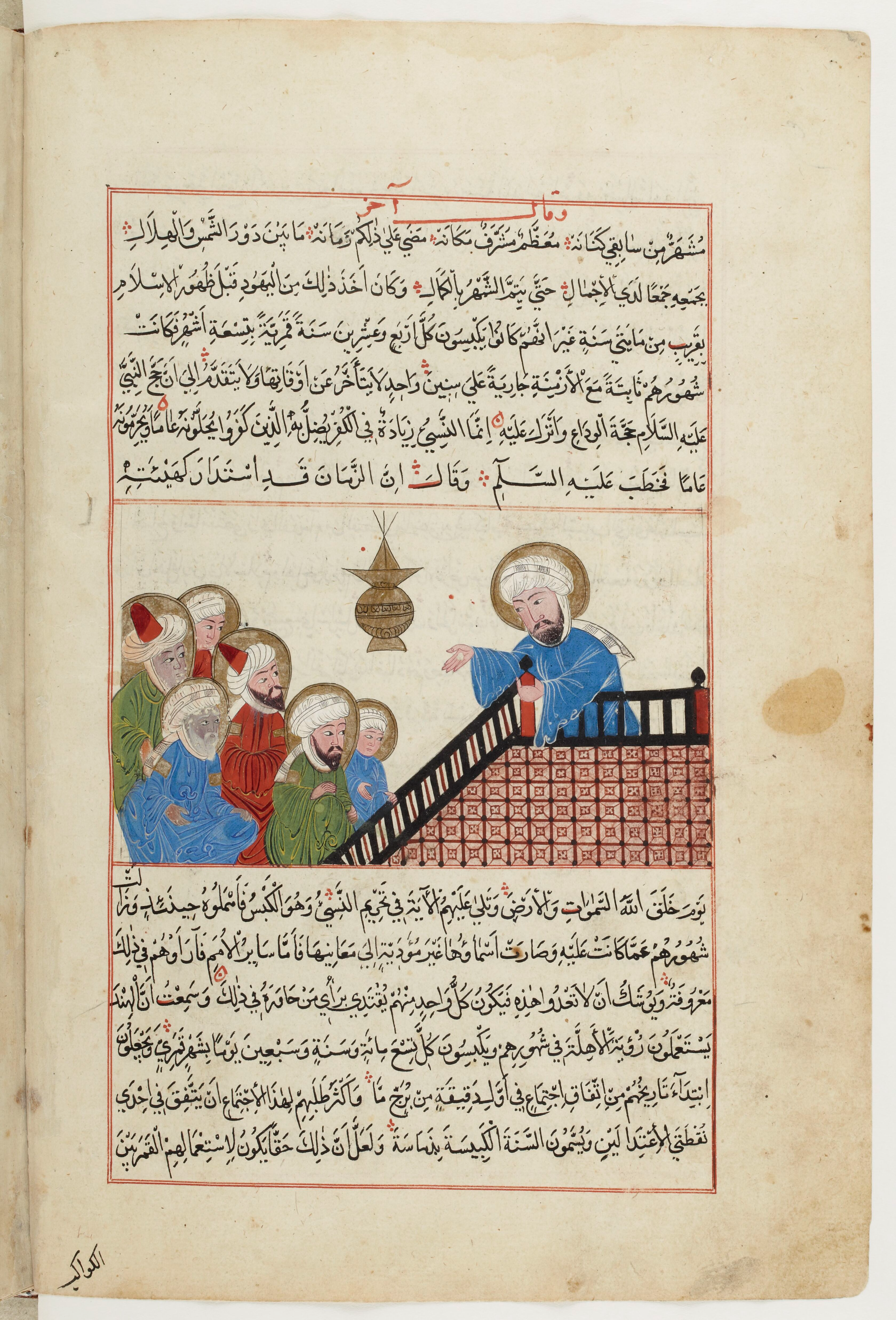
Illustration of Muhammad prohibiting Nasī'. Found in an illustrated copy of Al-Biruni's The Remaining Signs of Past Centuries (17th-century copy of an early 14th-century Ilkhanid manuscript).

Nasi' is interpreted to signify either the postponement of the pre-Islamic month of Hajj, or the (also pre-Islamic) practice of intercalation – periodic insertion of an additional month to reset the calendar to align with the seasons, as with lunisolar calendars.

In the tenth year of the Hijra, as documented in the Qur'an (Surah At-Tawbah (9):36–37), Muslims believe God revealed the "prohibition of the Nasī'".

Indeed, the number of months ordained by Allah is twelve—in Allah's Record since the day He created the heavens and the earth—of which four are sacred. That is the Right Way. So do not wrong one another during these months. And together fight the polytheists as they fight against you together. And know that Allah is with those mindful ˹of Him˺.
Reallocating the sanctity of ˹these˺ months is an increase in disbelief, by which the disbelievers are led ˹far˺ astray. They adjust the sanctity one year and uphold it in another, only to maintain the number of months sanctified by Allah, violating the very months Allah has made sacred. Their evil deeds have been made appealing to them. And Allah does not guide the disbelieving people.

— Surah At-Tawbah 9:36

The prohibition of Nasī' would presumably have been announced when the intercalated month had returned to its position just before the month of Nasi' began. If Nasī' meant intercalation, then the number and the position of the intercalary months between AH 1 and AH 10 are uncertain; western calendar dates commonly cited for key events in early Islam such as the Hijra, the Battle of Badr, the Battle of Uhud and the Battle of the Trench should be viewed with caution as they might be in error by one, two, three or even four lunar months. This prohibition was mentioned by Muhammad during the farewell sermon which was delivered on 9 Dhu'l-Hijja AH 10 (Julian date Friday 6 March 632 CE) on Mount Arafat during the farewell pilgrimage to Mecca.

Certainly the Nasi' is an impious addition, which has led the infidels into error. One year they authorise the Nasi', another year they forbid it. They observe the divine precept with respect to the number of the sacred months, but in fact they profane that which God has declared to be inviolable, and sanctify that which God has declared to be profane. Assuredly time, in its revolution, has returned to such as it was at the creation of the heavens and the earth. In the eyes of God the number of the months is twelve. Among these twelve months four are sacred, namely, Rajab, which stands alone, and three others which are consecutive.

— Translated by Sherrard Beaumont Burnaby

The three successive sacred (forbidden) months mentioned by Muhammad (months in which battles are forbidden) are Dhu'l-Qa'da, Dhu'l-Hijja, and Muharram, months 11, 12, and 1 respectively. The single forbidden month is Rajab, month 7. These months were considered forbidden both within the new Islamic calendar and within the old pagan Meccan calendar.

== Days of the week ==
Traditionally, the Islamic day begins at sunset and ends at the next sunset. Each Islamic day thus begins at nightfall and ends at the end of daylight.

The days in the seven-day week are, with the exception of the last two days, named after their ordinal place in the week.

On the sixth day of the week, the "gathering day" (Yawm al-Jumʿah), Muslims assemble for the Friday-prayer at a local mosque at noon. The "gathering day" is often regarded as the weekly day off. This is frequently made official, with many Muslim countries adopting Friday and Saturday (e.g. Egypt, Saudi Arabia) or Thursday and Friday as official weekends, during which offices are closed; other countries (e.g. Iran) choose to make Friday alone a day of rest. A few others (e.g. Indonesia, Turkey, Pakistan, Morocco, Nigeria, Malaysia) have adopted the Saturday-Sunday weekend while making Friday a working day with a long midday break to allow time off for worship.

No.	Name	Arabic	Meaning	English equivalent
1	al-ʾAḥad	ٱلْأَحَد	the One	Saturday night and Sunday daytime
2	al-Ithnayn	الاِثْنَيْن	the Second	Sunday night and Monday daytime
3	ath-Thulāthāʾ	ٱلثُّلَاثَاء	the Third	Monday night and Tuesday daytime
4	al-ʾArbiʿāʾ	ٱلْأَرْبِعَاء	the Fourth	Tuesday night and Wednesday daytime
5	al-Khamīs	ٱلْخَمِيس	the Fifth	Wednesday night and Thursday daytime
6	al-Jumʿah	ٱلْجُمْعَة	the Gathering	Thursday night and Friday daytime
7	as-Sabt	ٱلسَّبْت	the Rest	Friday night and Saturday daytime

== Months ==
Each month of the Islamic calendar commences on the birth of the new lunar cycle. Traditionally, this is based on actual observation of the first crescent of the new moon (al-hilāl, the beginning part; Arabic: هلال), which marks the end of the previous lunar cycle (and hence the previous month), and so marks the beginning the new month. Consequently, each month can have 29 or 30 days depending on the visibility of the Moon, astronomical positioning of the Earth and weather conditions. (Note: Certain sects and groups, most notably Bohras Muslims namely Alavis, Dawoodis and Sulaymanis and Shia Ismaili Muslims, use a tabular Islamic calendar in which odd-numbered months have 30 days and even months have 29, except that the twelfth month has 30 days in a leap year. However this article is about the calendar used by Sunni Islam, in which there are no explicit leap years.)

Four of the twelve Hijri months are considered sacred: Rajab (7), and the three consecutive months of Ḏū l-Qaʿda (11), Ḏū l-Ḥijja (12) and Muḥarram (1), in which battles are forbidden.

Sacred months
No.	Name	Arabic	Meaning	Note
1	al-Muḥarram	ٱلْمُحَرَّم	forbidden	A sacred month, so called because battle and all kinds of fighting are forbidden (ḥarām) during this month. Muharram includes Ashura, the tenth day.
2	Ṣafar	صَفَر	void	Supposedly named this because pre-Islamic Arab houses were empty this time of year while their occupants gathered food.
3	Rabīʿ al-ʾAwwal	رَبِيع ٱلْأَوَّل	the first spring	Also means to graze, because cattle were grazed during this month. Also a very holy month of celebration for many Muslims, as it was the month Muhammad was born.
4	Rabīʿ ath-Thānī or Rabīʿ al-ʾĀkhir	رَبِيع ٱلثَّانِي or رَبِيع ٱلْآخِر	the second spring, the last spring	
5	Jumādā l-ʾŪlā	جُمَادَى ٱلْأُولَى	the first of parched land	Often considered the pre-Islamic summer. Jumādā may also be related to a verb meaning "to freeze" and another account relates that water would freeze during this time of year.
6	Jumādā th-Thāniya or Jumādā l-ʾĀkhira	جُمَادَى ٱلثَّانِيَة or جُمَادَى ٱلْآخِرَة	the second of parched land, the last of parched land	
7	Rajab	رَجَب	respect, honour	This is the second sacred month in which fighting is forbidden. Rajab may also be related to a verb meaning "to remove", so called because pre-Islamic Arabs would remove the heads of their spears and refrain from fighting.
8	Shaʿbān	شَعْبَان	scattered	Marked the time of year when Arab tribes dispersed to find water. Sha‘bān may also be related to a verb meaning "to be in between two things". Another account relates that it was called thus because the month lies between Rajab and Ramadan.
9	Ramaḍān	رَمَضَان	burning heat	Burning is related to fasting as with an empty stomach one's worldly desire will burn. Supposedly so called because of high temperatures caused by the excessive heat of the sun. Ramaḍān is the most venerated month of the Hijri calendar. During this time, Muslims must fast and not do anything sinful from pre-dawn until sunset and should give charity to the poor and needy.
10	Shawwāl	شَوَّال	raised	Female camels would normally be in calf at this time of year and raise their tails. At the first day of this month, the Eid al-Fitr, "Festival of Breaking the Fast" begins, marking the end of fasting and the end of Ramadan.
11	Dhū l-Qaʿda	ذُو ٱلْقَعْدَة	the one of truce/sitting	This is a holy month during which war is banned. People are allowed to defend themselves if attacked.
12	Dhū l-Ḥijja	ذُو ٱلْحِجَّة	the one of pilgrimage	During this month Muslim pilgrims from all around the world congregate at Mecca to visit the Kaaba. The Hajj is performed on the eighth, ninth and the tenth of this month. Day of Arafah takes place on the ninth of the month. Eid al-Adha, the "Festival of the Sacrifice", begins on the tenth day and ends on the thirteenth, and this is a fourth holy month during which war is banned.

=== Alternative names ===
==== Afghan lunar calendar ====
The "Afghan lunar calendar" refers to two distinct naming systems for the months of the Hijri calendar, one of which was used by the Pashtuns and the other by the Hazaras. They were in use until the time of Amanullah Khan's reign, when the usage of the Solar Hijri Calendar was formalized across Afghanistan.

==== Turki lunar calendar ====
In Xinjiang, the Uyghur Muslims traditionally had different names for the months of the Hijri calendar, which were in use until the adoption of the Gregorian calendar in the 20th century. These names were collectively referred to as the "Turki lunar year" or "Turki lunar calendar".

No.	Arabic name	Uyghur name		Pashto name	Hazaragi name
No.	Arabic name	Chagatay	Modern Uyghur	Pashto name	Hazaragi name
1	المحرم, al-muḥarram	عشور ای, äşûr ay	ئەشۇر ئاي, eshur ay	حسن او حسین, hasan aw husayn	عاشور, āšūr
2	صفر, ṣafar	صفر ای, säfär ay	سەپەر ئاي, seper ay	صفره, safara	صفر, safar
3	ربيع الأول, rabīʿa l-ʾawwal or ربيع الأولى, rabīʿa l-ʾūlā	صفر قوشنیسی, säfär qoşnısı	سەپەر قوشنىسى, seper qoshnisi	لومړۍ خور, lūmṛəy xor	الغوی اول, alğō-yi awwal
4	ربيع الثاني, rabīʿa th-thānī or ربيع الآخر, rabīʿa l-ʾākhir	جمادی‌الاول, cämâdiyyul-ävväl	جەمادىئۇل-ئەۋۋەل, jemadiul-ewwel	دويمه خور, dwayəma xor	الغوی دویم, alğō-yi duyum
5	جمادى الأول, jumādā l-ʾawwal or جمادى الأولى, jumādā l-ʾūlā	جمادی‌الآخر, cämâdiyyul-âxir	جەمادىئۇل-ئاخىر, jemadiul-axir	درېيمه خور, dreyəma xor	الغوی سیم, alğō-yi seyum
6	جمادى الثانية, jumādā th-thāniyah or جمادى الآخرة, jumādā l-ʾākhirah	تلاش ای, talaş ay	تالاش ئاي, talash ay	څلرمه خور, tsalarəma xor	الغوی چارم, alğō-yi čārum
7	رجب, rajab	دعا ای, duâ ay	دۇئا ئاي, dua ay	خدای تعالی مياشت, xudāy taālā myāšt	رجب, rajab
8	شعبان, shaʿbān	برائت ای, bärâät ay or برات ای, bärât ay	بارات ئاي, barat ay	برات, barāt	شعبو, ša'bō
9	رمضان, ramaḍān	روزە ای, rôzä ay	روزا ئاي, roza ay	روژه, roža	رمضو, ramazō
10	شوال, shawwāl	عید ای, ayd ay	ھېيت ئاي, hëyt ay	وړکی اختر, waṛakay axtar	عید, īd
11	ذو القعدة, ḏū l-qaʿdah	آرا ای, ara ay	ئارا ئاي, ara ay	مياني, miyānī	خالی, xālī
12	ذو الحجة, ḏū l-ḥijjah	عید قربان ای, aydi-qurbân ay	ھېيتى-قۇربان ئاي, hëyti-qurban ay	لوی اختر, loy axtar	قربو, qurbō

=== Alternative order ===
Twelver Shia Muslims believe the Islamic new year and first month of the Hijri calendar is Rabi' al-Awwal rather than Muharram, due to it being the month in which the Hijrah took place. This has led to difference regarding description of the years in which some events took place, such as the Muharram-occurring battle of Karbala, which Shias say took place in 60 AH, while Sunnis say it took place in 61 AH.

== Length of year ==
The mean duration of a tropical year (a 'solar year') is 365.24219 days, while the long-term average duration of a synodic month (a 'lunar month') is 29.530587981 days. Thus the average lunar year (twelve new moons) is 10.87513 days shorter than the average solar year (365.24219 − (12 × 29.530587981)), causing months of the Hijri calendar to advance about eleven days earlier each year, relative to the equinoxes. (Note: The precise number varies, depending on the length of the synodic month (the time it takes the Moon to reach the same visual phase. This varies notably throughout the year.)) "As a result," says the Astronomical Almanac, "the cycle of twelve lunar months regresses through the seasons over a period of about 33 [solar] years". (Note: This means that there are 34 Hijri years to 33 Gregorian years.)

== Year numbering ==
In pre-Islamic Arabia, it was customary to identify a year after a major event which took place in it. Thus, according to Islamic tradition, Abraha, governor of Yemen, then a province of the Christian Kingdom of Aksum of Northeast Africa and South Arabia, attempted to destroy the Kaaba with an army which included several elephants. The raid was unsuccessful, but that year became known as the Year of the Elephant, during which Muhammad was born (surah al-Fil). Most equate this to the year 570 CE, but a minority use 571 CE.

The first ten years of the Hijra were not numbered, but were named after events in the life of Muhammad according to al-Biruni:

1. The year of permission.
2. The year of the order of fighting.
3. The year of the trial.
4. The year of congratulation on marriage.
5. The year of the earthquake.
6. The year of enquiring.
7. The year of gaining victory.
8. The year of equality.
9. The year of exemption.
10. The year of farewell.

In c. 638 (17 AH), Abu Musa al-Ash'ari, one of the officials of the Rashid Caliph Umar (r. 634–644) in Basra, complained about the absence of any years on the correspondence he received from Umar, making it difficult for him to determine which instructions were most recent. This report convinced Umar of the need to introduce an era for Muslims. After debating the issue with his counsellors, he decided that the first year should be the year of Muhammad's arrival at Medina (known as Yathrib, before Muhammad's arrival). Uthman then suggested that the months begin with Muharram, in line with the established custom of the Arabs at that time. The years of the Islamic calendar thus began with the month of Muharram in the year of Muhammad's arrival at the city of Medina, even though the actual emigration took place in Safar and Rabi' I of the intercalated calendar, two months before the commencement of Muharram in the new fixed calendar. Because of the Hijra, the calendar was named the Hijri calendar.

F A Shamsi (1984) postulated that the Arabic calendar was never intercalated. According to him, the first day of the first month of the new fixed Islamic calendar (1 Muharram AH 1) was no different from what was observed at the time. The day the Prophet moved from Quba' to Medina was originally 26 Rabi' I on the pre-Islamic calendar. 1 Muharram of the new fixed calendar corresponded to Friday, 16 July 622 CE, the equivalent civil tabular date (same daylight period) in the Julian calendar. The Islamic day began at the preceding sunset on the evening of 15 July. This Julian date (16 July) was determined by medieval Muslim astronomers by projecting back in time their own tabular Islamic calendar, which had alternating 30- and 29-day months in each lunar year plus eleven leap days every 30 years. For example, al-Biruni mentioned this Julian date in the year 1000 CE. Although not used by either medieval Muslim astronomers or modern scholars to determine the Islamic epoch, the thin crescent moon would have also first become visible (assuming clouds did not obscure it) shortly after the preceding sunset on the evening of 15 July, 1.5 days after the associated dark moon (astronomical new moon) on the morning of 14 July.

Though Michael Cook and Patricia Crone in their book Hagarism cite a coin from AH 17, the first surviving attested use of a Hijri calendar date alongside a date in another calendar (Coptic) is on a papyrus from Egypt in AH 22, PERF 558.

== Astronomical determination of hilal ==
Due to its reliance on actual observation of the first crescent of the new Moon to determine its month-start-dates, the traditional dating system sometimes varies slightly from the astronomically determined start-dates of the Umm al-Qura calendar (see below). In practice, the days differ by no more than one day (whereas the arithmetically derived Tabular Islamic calendar can be adrift by one or two days). Neither the observation calendar, the astronomical calendar nor the tabular calendar take any account of the solar year in their calculations, and thus each of these strictly lunar based calendar systems have no relevance to the timing of the four seasons of the year.

In the astronomical Umm al-Qura calendar system, the precise relative motions of the Sun, Moon and Earth are calculated. In this system, a new moon begins precisely at the time of the monthly conjunction, when the Moon is located most directly between the Earth and the Sun. The Islamic month begins a little later, on the evening of the day on which conjunction has occurred before sunset and moonset after it (see below for details). This is the same moment as when actual observation should be possible if weather conditions are favourable.

The observation calendar, however, is based on a different set of conventions being used for the determination of the month-start-dates. Each month still has either 29 or 30 days, but due to the variable method of observations employed, there is usually no discernible order in the sequencing of either 29 or 30-day month lengths. Traditionally, the first day of each month is the day (beginning at sunset) of the first sighting of the hilal (crescent moon) shortly after sunset. If the hilal is not observed immediately after the 29th day of a month (either because clouds block its view or because the western sky is still too bright when the moon sets), then the day that begins at that sunset is the 30th. Such a sighting has to be made by one or more trustworthy men testifying before a committee of Muslim leaders. Determining the most likely day that the hilal could be observed was a motivation for Muslim interest in astronomy, which put Islam in the forefront of that science for many centuries. Still, due to the fact that both lunar reckoning systems are ultimately based on the lunar cycle itself, all three systems still do roughly correspond to one another, never being more than two days out of synchronisation with one another.

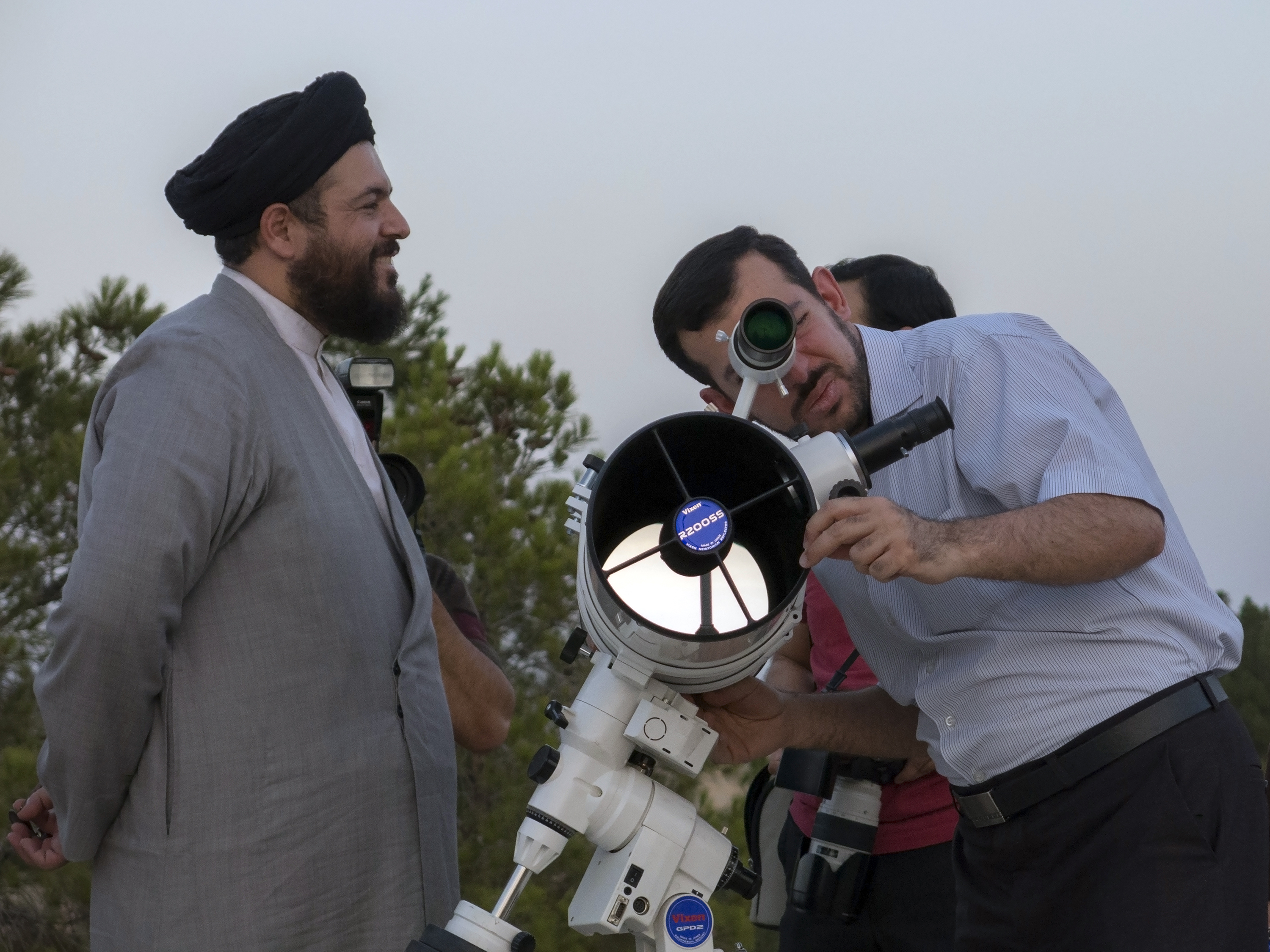
Muslim clerics observe the moon.

This traditional practice for the determination of the start-date of the month is still followed in the overwhelming majority of Muslim countries. For instance, Saudi Arabia uses the sighting method to determine the beginning of each month of the Hijri calendar. Since AH 1419 (1998/99), several official hilal sighting committees have been set up by the government to determine the first visual sighting of the lunar crescent at the beginning of each lunar month. Nevertheless, the religious authorities also allow the testimony of less experienced observers and thus often announce the sighting of the lunar crescent on a date when none of the official committees could see it.

Each Islamic state proceeds with its own monthly observation of the new moon (or, failing that, awaits the completion of 30 days) before declaring the beginning of a new month on its territory. However, the lunar crescent becomes visible only some 17 hours after the conjunction, and only subject to the existence of a number of favourable conditions relative to weather, time, geographic location, as well as various astronomical parameters. Given the fact that the moon sets progressively later than the sun as one goes west, with a corresponding increase in its "age" since conjunction, Western Muslim countries may, under favorable conditions, observe the new moon one day earlier than eastern Muslim countries. Due to the interplay of all these factors, the beginning of each month differs from one Muslim country to another, during the 48-hour period following the conjunction. The information provided by the calendar in any country does not extend beyond the current month.

A number of Muslim countries try to overcome some of these difficulties by applying different astronomy-related rules to determine the beginning of months. Thus, Malaysia, Indonesia, and a few others begin each month at sunset on the first day that the moon sets after the sun (moonset after sunset). In Egypt, the month begins at sunset on the first day that the moon sets at least five minutes after the sun. A detailed analysis of the available data shows, however, that there are major discrepancies between what countries say they do on this subject, and what they actually do. In some instances, what a country says it does is impossible.

Due to the somewhat variable nature of the Islamic calendar, in most Muslim countries, the Islamic calendar is used primarily for religious purposes, while the Solar-based Gregorian calendar is still used primarily for matters of commerce and agriculture.

=== Theological considerations ===
If users of the traditional observation-based calendar were prepared using astronomical calculations, Muslims world-wide could use it to meet all their needs, the way they use the Gregorian calendar today. But, there are divergent views on whether it is licit to do so.

A majority of theologians oppose the use of calculations (beyond the constraint that each month must be not less than 29 nor more than 30 days) on the grounds that the latter would not conform with Muhammad's recommendation to observe the new moon of Ramadan and Shawal in order to determine the beginning of these months. (Note: Some theologians also interpret Surah al-Baqarah 2:185 as requiring direct sighting, but they represent only a minority. The Quranic verse reads as follows : "The month of Ramadân in which was revealed the Qur'ân, a guidance for mankind and clear proofs for the guidance and the criterion (between right and wrong). So whoever of you sights (the crescent on the first night of) the month (of Ramadân i.e., is present at his home), he must observe Saum (fasts) that month, and whoever is ill or on a journey, the same number [of days which one did not observe Saum (fasts) must be made up] from other days. God intends for you ease, and He does not want to make things difficult for you. (He wants that you) must complete the same number (of days), and that you must magnify God [i.e., to say Takbîr ("Allāhu-Akbar", [i.e.] "God is the Most Great") on seeing the crescent of the months of Ramadân and Shawwâl] for having guided you so that you may be grateful to Him."- Quran 2:185 ^{-Noble Quran (Hilali–Khan)}.)

However, some Islamic jurists see no contradiction between Muhammad's teachings and the use of calculations to determine the beginnings of lunar months. They consider that Muhammad's recommendation was adapted to the culture of the times, and should not be confused with the acts of worship. (Note: The dynasty of Fatimids in Egypt used a tabular pre-calculated calendar over a period of two centuries, between the 10th and 12th centuries, before a change of political regime reactivated the procedure of observation of the new moon.) The jurists Ahmad Muhammad Shakir and Yusuf al-Qaradawi both endorsed the use of calculations to determine the beginning of all months of the Islamic calendar, in 1939 and 2004 respectively. So did the Fiqh Council of North America (FCNA) in 2006 and the European Council for Fatwa and Research (ECFR) in 2007.

The major Muslim associations of France also announced in 2012 that they would henceforth use a calendar based on astronomical calculations, taking into account the criteria of the possibility of crescent sighting in any place on Earth. But, shortly after the official adoption of this rule by the French Council of the Muslim Faith (CFCM) in 2013, the new leadership of the association decided, on the eve of Ramadan 2013, to follow the Saudi announcement rather than to apply the rule just adopted. This resulted in a division of the Muslim community of France, with some members following the new rule, and others following the Saudi announcement.

== Calculated Islamic calendars ==
=== Islamic calendar of Turkey ===
Turkish Muslims use an Islamic calendar which is calculated several years in advance by the Turkish Presidency of Religious Affairs (Diyanet İşleri Başkanlığı). From 1 Muharrem 1400 AH (21 November 1979) until 29 Zilhicce 1435 (24 October 2014), the computed Turkish lunar calendar was based on the following rule: "The lunar month is assumed to begin on the evening when, within some region of the terrestrial globe, the computed centre of the lunar crescent at local sunset is more than 5° above the local horizon and (geocentrically) more than 8° from the Sun." In the current rule, the (computed) lunar crescent has to be above the local horizon of Ankara at sunset.

=== Saudi Arabia's Umm al-Qura calendar ===
Saudi Arabia has traditionally used the Umm al-Qura calendar, which is based on astronomical calculations, for administrative purposes. The parameters used in the establishment of this calendar underwent significant changes during the decade to AH 1423.

Before AH 1420 (18 April 1999), if the moon's age at sunset in Riyadh was at least 12 hours, then the day ending at that sunset was the first day of the month. This often caused the Saudis to celebrate holy days one or even two days before other predominantly Muslim countries, including the dates for the Hajj, which can only be dated using Saudi dates because it is performed in Mecca.

From AH 1420 to 1422, if moonset occurred after sunset at Mecca, then the day beginning at that sunset was the first day of a Saudi month, essentially the same rule used by Malaysia, Indonesia, and others (except for the location from which the hilal was observed).

Since the beginning of AH 1423 (16 March 2002), the rule has been clarified a little by requiring the geocentric conjunction of the sun and moon to occur before sunset, in addition to requiring moonset to occur after sunset at Mecca. This ensures that the moon has moved past the sun by sunset, even though the sky may still be too bright immediately before moonset to actually see the crescent.

On 14 February 2016, Saudi Arabia adopted the Gregorian calendar for payment of the monthly salaries of government employees (as a cost cutting measure), while retaining the Islamic calendar for religious purposes.

=== Tabular Islamic calendar ===
The Tabular Islamic calendar is a rule-based variation of the Islamic calendar, in which months are determined by arithmetic rather than by observation or astronomical calculation. A year of 12 lunar months is about 354.37 days long. The month is defined as the average duration of a revolution of the Moon around the Earth (29.53 days). By convention, months of 30 days and 29 days succeed each other, adding up over two successive months to 59 full days. This leaves only a small monthly variation of 44 minutes to account for, which adds up to a total of 24 hours (i.e., the equivalent of one full day) in 2.73 years. To settle accounts, eleven years in thirty have a leap day (in the most commonly used algorithm). In the long term, it is accurate to one day in about 2,500 solar years or 2,570 lunar years. It deviates by up to two days from observational calendars in the short term.

The Isma'ili-Taiyebi Bohras have the institution of da'i al-mutlaq to follow the tabular Islamic calendar as it is prepared on the basis of arithmetic calculations derived from the days of Fatimid imams. Followers of Tayyibi Isma'ilism are found in various Bohra communities (Dawoodi, Sulaymani, and Alavi), mainly in India and Pakistan.

Microsoft uses the Tabular Islamic calendar method to convert dates between the Gregorian and the Hijri calendar systems. Originally, it suggested that its method had been derived by its own statistical analysis of Kuwaiti practice, calling it "the Kuwaiti algorithm".

== Notable dates ==
Important dates in the Islamic (Hijri) year are:

- 1 Muharram: the Islamic New Year.
- 10 Muharram: Day of Ashura. For both Shias and Sunnis, the martyrdom of Husayn ibn Ali, the grandson of Muhammad, and his followers. For Sunnis, the crossing of the Red Sea by Moses occurred on this day, along with many other significant events in the lives of prophets and that have to do with Creation.
- 12 Rabi al-Awwal: Mawlid or Birth of the Prophet for Sunnis.
- 17 Rabi al-Awwal: Mawlid for Shias.
- 27 Rajab: Isra and Mi'raj for the majority of Muslims.
- 15 Sha'ban: Mid-Sha'ban, or Night of Forgiveness. For Shiites, also the birthday of Muhammad al-Mahdi, the Twelfth Imam.
- 1 Ramadan: The first day of fasting in Islam
- 27 Ramadan: Start of the Revelation of the Qur’an. The most probable day Muhammad received the first verses of the Quran (17 Ramadan in Indonesia and Malaysia).
- Last third of Ramadan which includes Laylat al-Qadr.
- Last Friday of Ramadan: Jumu'atul-Wida
- 1 Shawwal: Eid ul-Fitr.
- 8–13 Dhu'l-Hijja: The Hajj pilgrimage to Mecca.
- 9 Dhu'l-Hijja: Day of Arafa.
- 10 Dhu'l-Hijja: Eid al-Adha.

Days considered important predominantly for Shia Muslims:

- 9 Rabi' al-Awwal: Omar Koshan (Mukhtar al-Thaqafi avenges the events of Ashura).
- 13 Rajab: Birthday of Ali ibn Abi Talib
- 3 Sha'ban: Birthday of Husayn ibn Ali.
- 21 Ramadan: Martyrdom of Ali ibn Abi Talib.
- 18 Dhu'l-Hijja: the Eid al-Ghadir

== Uses ==
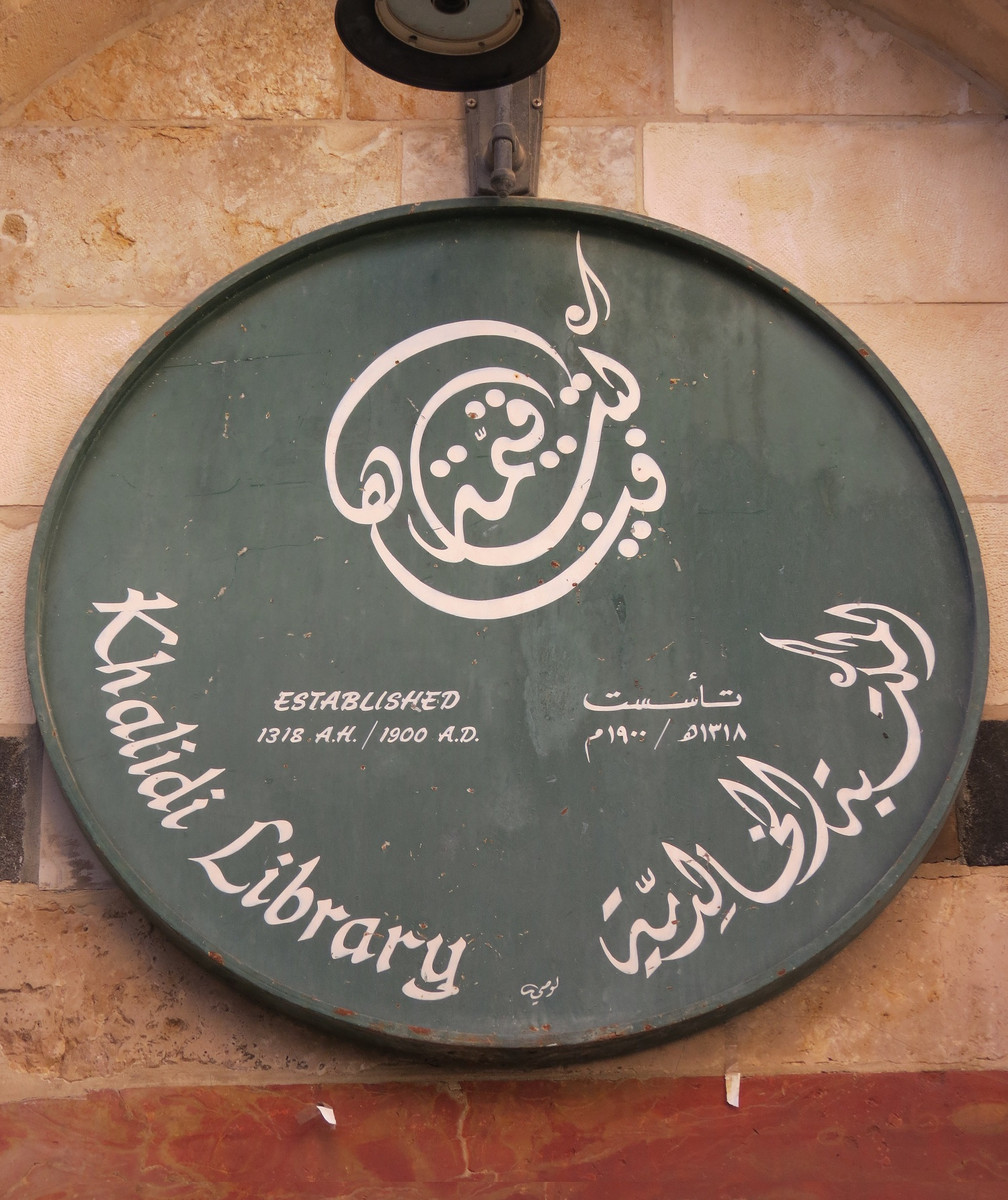
Civil and Hijri establishment dates of a library in Old City, Jerusalem

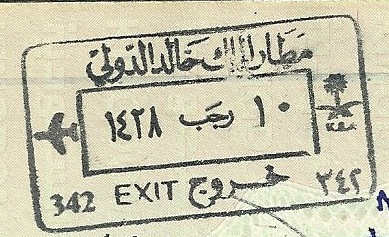
Islamic calendar stamp issued at King Khalid International Airport on 10 Rajab 1428 AH (24 July 2007 CE)

The Islamic calendar is now used primarily for religious purposes, and for official dating of public events and documents in Muslim countries. Because of its nature as a purely lunar calendar, it cannot be used for agricultural purposes and historically Islamic communities have used other calendars for this purpose: the Egyptian calendar was formerly widespread in Islamic countries, and the Iranian calendar, the Akbar's calendar (from where the Bengali calendar originated), the 1789 Ottoman calendar (a modified Julian calendar) were also used for agriculture in their countries. In the Levant and Iraq the Aramaic names of the Babylonian calendar are still used for all secular matters. In the Maghreb, Berber farmers in the countryside still use the Julian calendar for agrarian purposes. These local solar calendars have receded in importance with the near-universal adoption of the Gregorian calendar for civil purposes. Saudi Arabia uses the lunar Islamic calendar. (Note: The start of each lunar month determined not ahead of time by astronomical calculation, but only after the crescent moon is sighted by the proper religious authorities.) In Indonesia, the Javanese calendar combines elements of the Islamic and pre-Islamic Saka calendars.

British author Nicholas Hagger writes that after seizing control of Libya, Muammar Gaddafi "declared" on 1 December 1978 "that the Muslim calendar should start with the death of the prophet Mohammed in 632 rather than the hijra (Mohammed's 'emigration' from Mecca to Medina) in 622". This put the country ten solar years behind the standard Muslim calendar. However, according to the 2006 Encyclopedia of the Developing World, "More confusing still is Qaddafi's unique Libyan calendar, which counts the years from the Prophet's birth, or sometimes from his death. The months July and August, named after Julius and Augustus Caesar, are now Nasser and Hannibal respectively." Reflecting on a 2001 visit to the country, American reporter Neil MacFarquhar observed, "Life in Libya was so unpredictable that people weren't even sure what year it was. The year of my visit was officially 1369. But just two years earlier Libyans had been living through 1429. No one could quite name for me the day the count changed, especially since both remained in play. ... Event organizers threw up their hands and put the Western year in parentheses somewhere in their announcements."

== Computer support ==
- Hijri support was available in later versions of traditional Visual Basic, and is also available in the .NET Framework.
- Since the release of Java 8, the tabular Islamic calendar is supported in the new Date and Time API.

== See also ==
- Arabic names of Gregorian months
- Islamic New Year, 1 Muharram
- List of Islamic years (Lists both the Hijri date and the Gregorian date for the more significant events.)
- List of observances set by the Islamic calendar
- Pre-Islamic Arabian calendar
- Rumi calendar – Ottoman civil calendar (1839–1926)
- Solar Hijri calendar – Official calendar of Iran
- Timeline of Islamic history (Includes a list of Islamic centuries and the corresponding Gregorian years)
