= Year 2011 problem =

Computer dating problem in Taiwan

The year 2011 problem or the Y1C problem (simplified Chinese: 民国百年虫; traditional Chinese: 民國百年蟲; pinyin: Mínguó bǎinián chóng; lit. 'Minguo Year 100 bug') was a potential problem involving computers and computer systems in Taiwan in the night of 31 December 2010 and 1 January 2011.

Similar to the year 2000 problem faced by much of the world in the lead-up to 2000, the year 2011 problem is a side effect of Taiwan's use of the Republic of China calendar for official purposes. This calendar is based on the founding of the Republic of China in 1912 (year 1), so the year 2011 on the Gregorian calendar corresponds to year 100 on Taiwan's official calendar, which posed potential problems for any program that only treats years as two-digit values.

== Reported problems ==
As most Taiwanese had anticipated the problem after the year 2000 problem, the Y1C computer bug impact was minimal. Many computers were already using a three-digit system for dates, with a zero being used as the first digit for years below 100 (Gregorian 2010 or earlier).

Some government documents such as driver's licenses already refer to years over 100; nothing more than minor glitches were reported.

Some iPhone users reported that their alarm tool failed to function on 1 January 2011.

== See also ==
- Time formatting and storage bugs
