= 0000 =

0000 may refer to:

- The year 10,000 problem
- A null train reporting number or headcode
- A suffix to a time indicating Coordinated Universal Time, rather than a local time zone
- The null character
- Midnight in a 24-hour clock
