= System time =

Representation of time used in computers

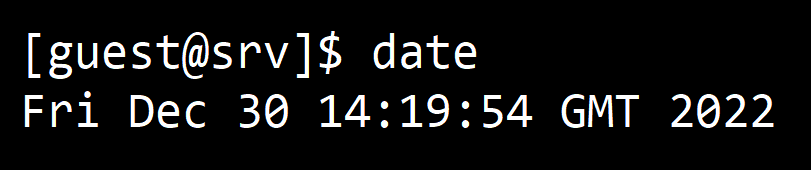
Unix date command

In computing, system time represents a computer system's notion of a point in time.

System time is measured by a system clock, which is typically implemented as a simple count of the number of ticks that have transpired since some arbitrary starting date, called the epoch. For example, Unix and POSIX-compliant systems encode system time ("Unix time") as the number of seconds elapsed since the start of the Unix epoch at 1 January 1970 00:00:00 UT, with exceptions for leap seconds. Systems that implement the 32-bit and 64-bit versions of the Windows API, such as Windows 9x and Windows NT, provide the system time as both SYSTEMTIME, represented as a year/month/day/hour/minute/second/milliseconds value, and FILETIME, represented as a count of the number of 100-nanosecond ticks since 1 January 1601 00:00:00 UT as reckoned in the proleptic Gregorian calendar.

System time can be converted into calendar time, which is a form more suitable for human comprehension. For example, the Unix system time 1000000000 seconds since the beginning of the epoch translates into the calendar time 9 September 2001 01:46:40 UT. Library subroutines that handle such conversions may also deal with adjustments for time zones, daylight saving time (DST), leap seconds, and the user's locale settings. Library routines are also generally provided that convert calendar times into system times.

Many implementations that currently store system times as 32-bit integer values will suffer from problems such as the impending Year 2038 problem. These time values will overflow ("run out of bits") after the end of their system time epoch, leading to software and hardware errors. These systems will require some form of remediation, similar to efforts required to solve the earlier Year 2000 problem. This will also be a potentially much larger problem for existing data file formats that contain system timestamps stored as 32-bit values.

== Other time measurements ==
Closely related to system time is process time, which is a count of the total CPU time consumed by an executing process. It may be split into user and system CPU time, representing the time spent executing user code and system kernel code, respectively. Process times are a tally of the time taken by CPU instructions or clock cycles and generally have no direct correlation to wall time.

File systems keep track of the times that files are created, modified, and/or accessed by storing timestamps in the file control block (or inode) of each file and directory.

== History ==
Most first-generation personal computers did not keep track of dates and times. These included systems that ran the CP/M operating system, as well as early models of the Apple II, the BBC Micro, and the Commodore PET, among others. Add-on peripheral boards that included real-time clock chips with on-board battery back-up were available for the IBM PC and XT, but the IBM AT was the first widely available PC that came equipped with date/time hardware built into the motherboard. Prior to the widespread availability of computer networks, most personal computer systems that did track system time did so only with respect to local time and did not make allowances for different time zones.

With current technology, most modern computers keep track of local civil time, as do many other household and personal devices such as VCRs, DVRs, cable TV receivers, PDAs, pagers, cell phones, fax machines, telephone answering machines, cameras, camcorders, central air conditioners, and microwave ovens.

Microcontrollers operating within embedded systems (such as the Raspberry Pi, Arduino, and other similar systems) do not always have internal hardware to keep track of time. Many such controller systems operate without knowledge of the external time. Those that require such information typically initialize their base time upon rebooting by obtaining the current time from an external source, such as from a time server or external clock, or by prompting the user to manually enter the current time.

== Implementation ==
The system clock is typically implemented as a programmable interval timer that periodically interrupts the CPU, which then starts executing a timer interrupt service routine. This routine typically adds one tick to the system clock (a simple counter) and handles other periodic housekeeping tasks (preemption, etc.) before returning to the task the CPU was executing before the interruption.

== Retrieving the current system time ==
06 November 2026 23:22:01 UTC

The Wikipedia system time when this page was last generated.
→

The following tables illustrate methods for retrieving the current system time in various operating systems, programming languages, and applications. Values marked by (*) are system-dependent and may differ across implementations. All dates are given as Gregorian or proleptic Gregorian calendar dates.

The resolution of an implementation's measurement of time does not imply the same precision of such measurements. For example, a system might return the current time as a value measured in microseconds, but actually be capable of discerning individual clock ticks with a frequency of only 100 Hz (10 ms).

=== Operating systems ===
Operating system	Command or function	Resolution	Epoch or range
Android	java.lang.System.currentTimeMillis()	1 ms	1 January 1970
BIOS (IBM PC)	INT 1Ah, AH=00h	54.9254 ms 18.2065 Hz	Midnight of the current day
BIOS (IBM PC)	INT 1Ah, AH=02h	1 s	Midnight of the current day
BIOS (IBM PC)	INT 1Ah, AH=04h	1 day	1 January 1980 to 31 December 1999 or 31 December 2079 (system dependent)
CP/M Plus	System Control Block: scb$base+58h, Days since 31 December 1977 scb$base+5Ah, Hour (BCD) scb$base+5Bh, Minute (BCD) scb$base+5Ch, Second (BCD)	1 s	31 December 1977 to 5 June 2157
CP/M Plus	BDOS function 69h> (T_GET): word, Days since 1 January 1978 byte, Hour (BCD) byte, Minute (BCD) byte, Second (BCD)	1 s	31 December 1977 to 5 June 2157
DOS (Microsoft)	C:\>DATE; C:\>TIME	10 ms	1 January 1980 to 31 December 2099
DOS (Microsoft)	INT 21h, AH=2Ch SYSTEM TIME; INT 21h, AH=2Ah SYSTEM DATE	10 ms	1 January 1980 to 31 December 2099
macOS, iOS, iPadOS, tvOS, watchOS, visionOS (Apple)	CFAbsoluteTimeGetCurrent()	< 1 ms (Note: The Apple Developer Documentation is not clear on the precision & range of CFAbsoluteTime/CFTimeInterval, except in the CFRunLoopTimerCreate documentation which refers to 'sub-millisecond at most' precision. However, the similar type NSTimeInterval appears to be interchangeable, and has the precision and range listed.)	1 January 2001 ±10,000 years
OpenVMS	SYS$GETTIM()	100 ns	17 November 1858 to 31 July 31,086
OpenVMS	gettimeofday()	1 μs	1 January 1970 to 7 February 2106
OpenVMS	clock_gettime()	1 ns	1 January 1970 to 7 February 2106
z/OS	STCK	2^{−12} μs 244.14 ps	1 January 1900 to 17 September 2042 UT
z/OS	STCKE	2^{−12} μs 244.14 ps	1 January 1900 to AD 36,765
Unix, POSIX (see also C date and time functions)	$ date time()	1 s	(*); 32-bit time_t: 1 January 1970 to 19 January 2038; 64-bit time_t: 1 January 1970 to 4 December AD 292,277,026,596
Unix, POSIX (see also C date and time functions)	gettimeofday()	1 μs	(*); 32-bit time_t: 1 January 1970 to 19 January 2038; 64-bit time_t: 1 January 1970 to 4 December AD 292,277,026,596
Unix, POSIX (see also C date and time functions)	clock_gettime()	1 ns	(*); 32-bit time_t: 1 January 1970 to 19 January 2038; 64-bit time_t: 1 January 1970 to 4 December AD 292,277,026,596
OS/2	DosGetDateTime()	10 ms	1 January 1980 to 31 December 2079
Windows	GetSystemTime()	1 ms	1 January 1601 to 14 September 30828, 02:48:05.4775807
Windows	GetSystemTimeAsFileTime()	100 ns	1 January 1601 to 14 September 30828, 02:48:05.4775807
Windows	GetSystemTimePreciseAsFileTime()	100 ns	1 January 1601 to 14 September 30828, 02:48:05.4775807

=== Programming languages and applications ===
Language/Application	Function or variable	Resolution	Epoch or range
Ada	Ada.Calendar.Clock	100 μs to 20 ms (*)	1 January 1901 to 31 December 2099 (*)
AWK	systime()	1 s	(*)
BASIC, True BASIC	DATE, DATE$ TIME, TIME$	1 s	(*)
Business BASIC	DAY, TIM	0.1 s	(*)
C (see C date and time functions)	time()	1 s (*) (Note: The C standard library does not specify any specific resolution, epoch, range, or datatype for system time values. The C++ library encompasses the C library, so it uses the same system time implementation as C.)	(*)
C++	std::time() std::chrono::system_clock::now()	1 s (*); 1 ns (C++11, OS dependent)	(*)
C#	System.DateTime.Now; System.DateTime.UtcNow	100 ns	1 January 0001 to 31 December 9999
CICS	ASKTIME	1 ms	1 January 1900
COBOL	FUNCTION CURRENT-DATE	1 s	1 January 1601
Common Lisp	(get-universal-time)	1 s	1 January 1900
Delphi (Borland)	date time	1 ms (floating point)	1 January 1900
Delphi (Embarcadero Technologies)	System.SysUtils.Time	1 ms	0/0/0000 0:0:0:000 to 12/31/9999 23:59:59:999 [sic]
Delphi (Embarcadero Technologies)	System.SysUtils.GetTime (alias for System.SysUtils.Time)	1 ms	0/0/0000 0:0:0:000 to 12/31/9999 23:59:59:999 [sic]
Delphi (Embarcadero Technologies)	System.SysUtils.Date	1 ms	0/0/0000 0:0:0:000 to 12/31/9999 0:0:0:000 [sic]
Delphi (Embarcadero Technologies)	System.DateUtils.Today	1 ms	0/0/0000 0:0:0:000 to 12/31/9999 0:0:0:000 [sic]
Delphi (Embarcadero Technologies)	System.DateUtils.Tomorrow	1 ms	0/0/0000 0:0:0:000 to 12/31/9999 0:0:0:000 [sic]
Delphi (Embarcadero Technologies)	System.DateUtils.Yesterday	1 ms	0/0/0000 0:0:0:000 to 12/31/9999 0:0:0:000 [sic]
Delphi (Embarcadero Technologies)	System.SysUtils.Now	1 s	0/0/0000 0:0:0:000 to 12/31/9999 23:59:59:000 [sic]
Delphi (Embarcadero Technologies)	System.SysUtils.DayOfWeek	1 day	1 to 7
Delphi (Embarcadero Technologies)	System.SysUtils.CurrentYear	1 year	(*)
Emacs Lisp	(current-time)	1 μs (*)	1 January 1970
Erlang	erlang:system_time(), os:system_time()	OS dependent, e.g. on Linux 1ns	1 January 1970
Excel	date()	?	0 January 1900
Fortran	DATE_AND_TIME; SYSTEM_CLOCK	(*)	1 January 1970
Fortran	CPU_TIME	1 μs	1 January 1970
Go	time.Now()	1 ns	1 January 0001
Haskell	Time.getClockTime	1 ps (*)	1 January 1970 (*)
Haskell	Data.Time.getCurrentTime	1 ps (*)	17 November 1858 (*)
Java	java.util.Date(); System.currentTimeMillis()	1 ms	1 January 1970
Java	System.nanoTime()	1 ns	arbitrary
Java	Clock.systemUTC()	1 ns	arbitrary
JavaScript, TypeScript	(new Date()).getTime(); Date.now()	1 ms	1 January 1970
JavaScript, TypeScript	Temporal.Now.instant().epochNanoseconds	1 ns	1 January 1970
Julia	Dates.now()	1 ms	1 January 0000
Matlab	now	1 s	0 January 0000
MUMPS	$H (short for $HOROLOG)	1 s	31 December 1840
LabVIEW	Tick Count	1 ms	00:00:00.000 1 January 1904
LabVIEW	Get Date/Time in Seconds	1 ms	00:00:00.000 1 January 1904
Objective-C	[NSDate timeIntervalSinceReferenceDate]	< 1 ms	1 January 2001 ±10,000 Years
OCaml	Unix.time()	1 s	1 January 1970
OCaml	Unix.gettimeofday()	1 μs	1 January 1970
Extended Pascal	GetTimeStamp()	1 s	(*)
Turbo Pascal	GetTime(); GetDate()	10 ms	(*)
Perl	time()	1 s	1 January 1970
Perl	Time::HiRes::time	1 μs	1 January 1970
PHP	time() mktime()	1 s	1 January 1970
PHP	microtime()	1 μs	1 January 1970
PureBasic	Date()	1 s	1 January 1970 to 19 January 2038
Python	datetime.now().timestamp()	1 μs (*)	1 January 1970
RPG	CURRENT(DATE), %DATE; CURRENT(TIME), %TIME	1 s	1 January 0001 to 31 December 9999
RPG	CURRENT(TIMESTAMP), %TIMESTAMP	1 μs	1 January 0001 to 31 December 9999
Ruby	Time.now()	1 μs (*)	1 January 1970 (to 19 January 2038 prior to Ruby 1.9.2)
Scheme	(get-universal-time)	1 s	1 January 1900
Smalltalk	Time microsecondClock (VisualWorks)	1 s (ANSI); 1 μs (VisualWorks); 1 s (Squeak)	1 January 1901 (*)
Smalltalk	Time totalSeconds (Squeak)	1 s (ANSI); 1 μs (VisualWorks); 1 s (Squeak)	1 January 1901 (*)
Smalltalk	SystemClock ticksNowSinceSystemClockEpoch (Chronos)	1 s (ANSI); 1 μs (VisualWorks); 1 s (Squeak)	1 January 1901 (*)
SQL	CURDATE() or CURRENT DATE; CURTIME() or CURRENT TIME; GETDATE() or GETUTCDATE(); NOW() or CURRENT TIMESTAMP; SYSDATE()	3 ms	1 January 1753 to 31 December 9999 (*)
SQL	CURDATE() or CURRENT DATE; CURTIME() or CURRENT TIME; GETDATE() or GETUTCDATE(); NOW() or CURRENT TIMESTAMP; SYSDATE()	1 min	1 January 1900 to 6 June 2079
Standard ML	Time.now()	1 μs (*)	1 January 1970 (*)
Tcl	[clock seconds]	1 s	1 January 1970
Tcl	[clock milliseconds]	1 ms	1 January 1970
Tcl	[clock microseconds]	1 μs	1 January 1970
Tcl	[clock clicks]	1 μs (*)	(*)
Windows PowerShell	Get-Date	100 ns	1 January 0001 to 31 December 9999
Windows PowerShell	[DateTime]::Now [DateTime]::UtcNow	100 ns	1 January 0001 to 31 December 9999
Visual Basic .NET	System.DateTime.Now; System.DateTime.UtcNow	100 ns	1 January 0001 to 31 December 9999

== See also ==
- Calendar
- DATE (command)
- Epoch
- GPS time
- Jiffy
- Network Time Protocol
- rdate
- TIME (command)
- time.h
- time_t
- Time formatting and storage bugs
- Time Protocol
- Time standard
- Timestamp
- Unix date command
- Unix time
- Unix time command
- Elapsed real time
- Year 2000 problem
- Year 2038 problem
