= Center for Year 2000 Strategic Stability =

The Center for Year 2000 Strategic Stability was a joint operation of the United States and Russian Federation designed to provide mutual assurance that neither nation was launching a nuclear first strike against the other during the transition from the year 1999 to the year 2000. The program arose out of concerns the Year 2000 problem might generate false positives in each nation's nuclear attack Early warning systems.

The center came online December 30, 1999 and was closed January 15, 2000. It operated from Peterson Air Force Base.
