= Time formatting and storage bugs =

Class of software bugs

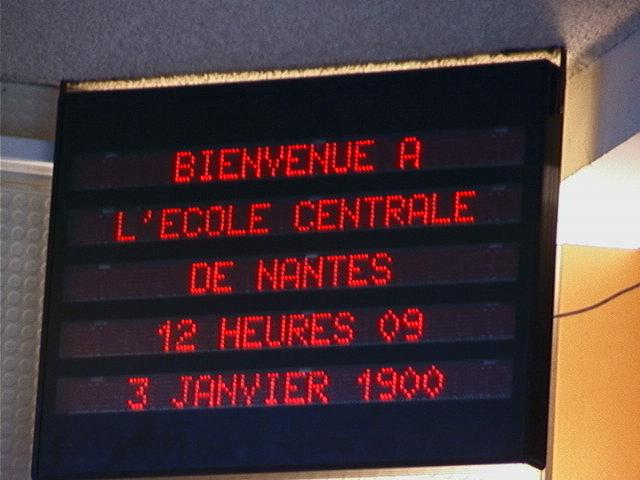
Y2K error on an electric display in Nantes, France, 3 January 2000

In computer science, data type limitations and software bugs can cause errors in time and date calculation or display. These are most commonly manifestations of arithmetic overflow, but can also be the result of other issues. The best-known consequence of this type is the Y2K problem, but many other milestone dates or times exist that have caused or will cause problems depending on various programming deficiencies.

== 20th century ==
=== 1975 ===
On 5 January 1975, the 12-bit field that had been used for dates in the TOPS-10 operating system for DEC PDP-10 computers overflowed, in a bug known as "DATE75". The field value was calculated by taking the number of years since 1 January 1964, multiplying by 12, adding the number of months since January, multiplying by 31, and adding the number of days since the start of the month. The maximum value representable using an unsigned 12-bit integer is 2^{12} − 1 = 4095, and the value of 4095 represents 4 January 1975: $(((11\text{ years since 1964})\times 12)+0\text{ months since January})\times31)+3\text{ days since start of the month}=4095$

Therefore 4 January 1975 is the latest encodable date. The "DATE-75" patch pushed the last encodable date to 1 February 2052, making the overflow date 2 February 2052, by using 3 spare bits from other fields in the file system's metadata, but this sometimes caused problems with software that used those bits for its own purposes. Some software may have supported using one additional bit for the date but had issues with additional bits, which could have resulted in some bugs on 9 January 1986.

=== 1978 ===
Digital Equipment Corporation's OS/8 operating system for the PDP-8 computer used a signed four-bit nibble to store the number of years since 1970, and this could only represent the years 1970 to 1977.

This was recognized when the COS-310 operating system was developed, and dates were recorded differently.

=== 1993 ===
Multiple Sierra Entertainment games released for the Classic Mac OS started to freeze when running on 18 September 1993. An issue in the Mac version of Sierra's Creative Interpreter (Mac SCI) would cause the game to "lock up" when attempting to handle a delay due to a problem involving an overflow. Mac SCI would attempt to use the date to determine how long a delay should last by getting the current time in seconds since 1 January 1904, the Macintosh epoch, and dividing by 12 hours. The division was processed by the Motorola 68000 and would not occur if an overflow was detected because of the division, but the Mac SCI would continue on regardless as if the division had occurred, eventually resulting in a delay of one second being treated as a delay of 18 hours and so on. Sierra released a patch called MCDATE that resolved the problem for almost 14 years.

=== 1997 ===
In Apollo Computer's Domain/OS operating system, absolute time was stored as a signed 48-bit integer representing the number of 4-microsecond units since 1 January 1980. This value overflowed on 2 November 1997, rendering unpatched systems unusable.

=== 1999 ===
In the last few months before the year 2000, two other date-related milestones occurred that received less publicity than the then-impending Y2K problem.

==== First GPS rollover ====
GPS dates are expressed as a week number and a day-of-week number, with the week number transmitted as a ten-bit value. This means that every 1,024 weeks (about 19 1/2 years) after Sunday 6 January 1980, (the GPS epoch), the date resets again to that date; this happened for the first time at 23:59:47 on 21 August 1999, the second time at 23:59:42 UTC on 6 April 2019, and will happen again on 20 November 2038. To address this concern, modernised GPS navigation messages use a 13-bit field, which only repeats every 8,192 weeks (157 years), and will not return to zero until the year 2137.

==== 9/9/99 ====
Many legacy programs or data sets used 9/9/99 as a rogue value to indicate either an unresolved date or as a terminator to indicate no further data was in the set. This caused many systems to crash upon the arrival of 9 September 1999.

== Early 21st century ==
=== 2000 ===
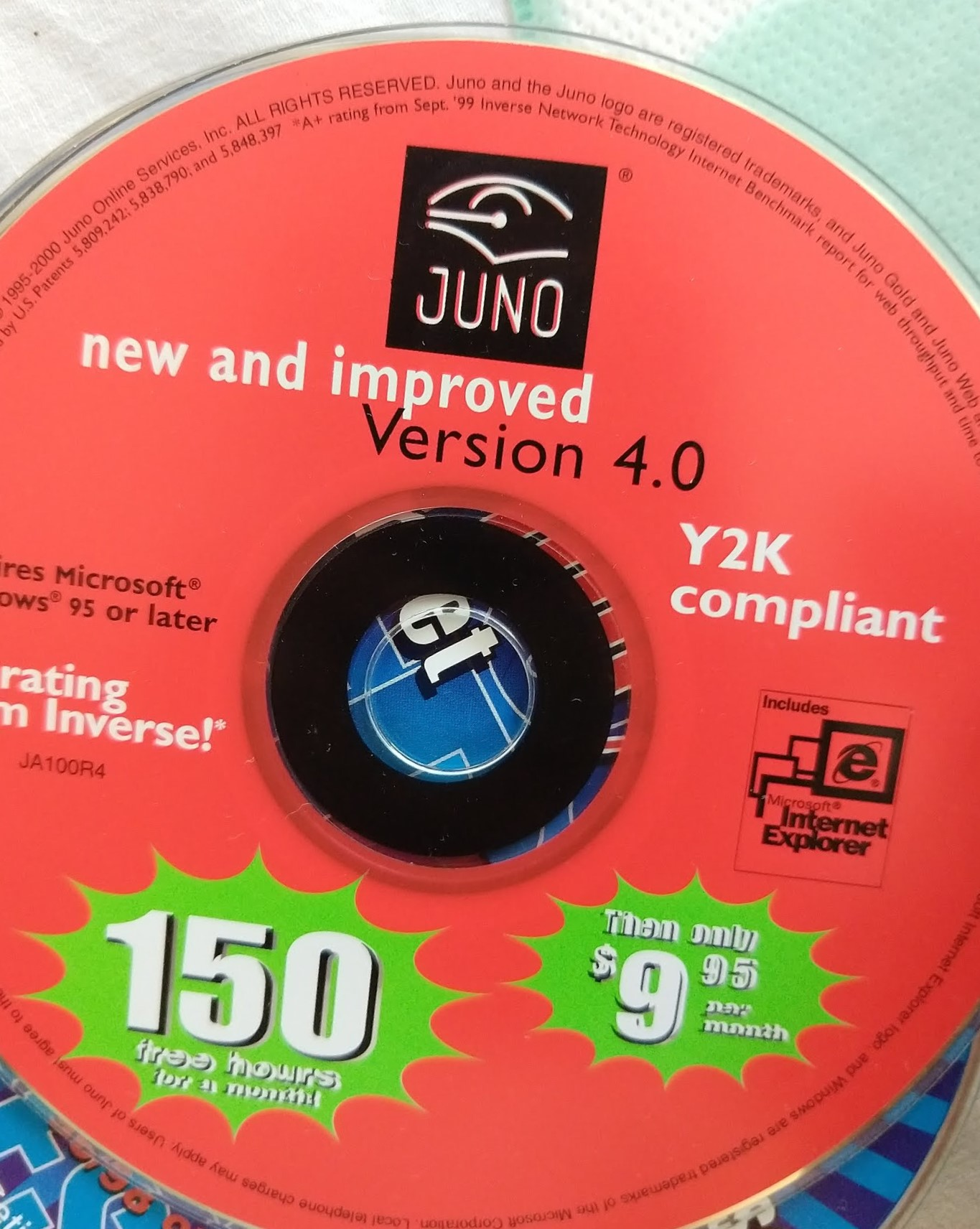
CD-ROM with software from Juno, advertising itself as Y2K-compliant.

==== Two-digit year representations ====
The term year 2000 problem, or simply Y2K, refers to potential computer errors related to the formatting and storage of calendar data for dates in and after the year 2000. Many programs represented four-digit years with only the final two digits, making the year 2000, as 00, indistinguishable from 1900. Computer systems' inability to distinguish dates correctly had the potential to bring down worldwide infrastructures for computer reliant industries.

For applications required to calculate the birth year (or another past year), such an algorithm has long been used to overcome the year 1900 problem, but it has failed to recognise people over 100 years old.

=== 2001 ===
Systems that used a string of nine digits to record the time as seconds since the Unix epoch had issues reporting times beyond the one-billionth second after the epoch on 9 September 2001 at 01:46:40 (the "billennium"). Problems were not widespread.

=== 2007 ===
Sierra Entertainment games for the Classic Mac OS that were patched with the MCDATE program or released afterwards with the patch built in would begin to freeze on 28 May 2007. As with the Year 1993 problem, this was due to an issue in the Mac SCI when attempting to use the date to determine how long a delay should last. Programs with the MCDATE patch freeze because the Mac SCI takes the current number of seconds since the Macintosh epoch of 1 January 1904, subtracts 432,000,000 seconds from that, and then divides by 12 hours through the Motorola 68000, to then determine how long delays should last. On 28 May 2007, the Motorola 68000 again does not divide due to overflow protection, which the Mac SCI ignores.

=== 2010 ===
Some systems had problems once the year rolled over to 2010. This was dubbed by some in the media as the "Y2K+10" or "Y2.01k" problem.

The main source of problems was confusion between hexadecimal number encoding and BCD encodings of numbers. The numbers zero through nine are encoded in both hexadecimal and BCD as 00 through 09. But, the decimal number ten is encoded in hexadecimal as 0A and in BCD as 10. Thus a BCD 10 interpreted as a hexadecimal encoding erroneously gives the decimal number sixteen.

For example, the SMS protocol uses BCD encoding for dates, so some mobile phone software incorrectly reported dates of messages as 2016 instead of 2010. Windows Mobile was the first software reported to have been affected by this glitch; in some cases WM6 changed the date of any incoming SMS message sent after 1 January 2010, from the year 2010 to 2016.

The most notable glitch occurred in Germany, where upwards of 20 million bank cards became unusable, and with Citibank Belgium, whose customer identification chips stopped working.

Other systems affected include EFTPOS terminals, and the PlayStation 3 (except the Slim model). The PlayStation 3 incorrectly treated 2010 as a leap year, so the non-existent 29 February 2010, was shown on 1 March 2010, causing a program error.

=== 2011 ===
Taiwan officially uses the Minguo calendar, which considers the Gregorian year 1912 to be its year 1. Thus, the Gregorian year 2011 is the ROC year 100, its first 3-digit year. This causes the year to appear to be 1911 (Year 0) if 2-digit representations are used.

=== 2013 ===
The Deep Impact space probe lost communication with Earth on 11 August 2013, because of a time-tagging problem; the date was stored as an unsigned 32-bit integer counting the number of tenths of a second since 1 January 2000.

=== 2019 ===
==== Second GPS rollover ====
In 2019, the second GPS week number rollover occurred. Meade computerized telescopes with GPS like the LX200GPS could no longer find their location and thus could not align themselves or locate stellar objects. Meade released firmware version 4.2k with a fix but which also introduced many new bugs; version 4.2l (a lowercase L, often confused with uppercase I) was then released to fix that, but had more inexplicable changes. A third party, StarPatch, released a hacked version of firmware version 4.2g at no cost to fix these issues.

==== Japanese calendar transition ====
On 30 April 2019, Emperor Akihito of Japan abdicated in favor of his son Naruhito. As years in Japan are traditionally referred to by era names that correspond to the reign of each emperor, this resulted in a new era name, Reiwa (令和), following Naruhito's accession to the throne the following day. Because the previous emperor, Hirohito, died 7 January 1989, and Akihito's reign mostly corresponded with the rise in the use of computers, most software had not been tested to ensure correct behavior on an era change, while testing was further complicated by the fact that the new era name was not revealed until 1 April 2019. Therefore, errors were expected from software that did not anticipate a new era.

=== 2020 ===
The video games WWE 2K20 and Star Wars Jedi: Fallen Order both crashed on 1 January 2020, when the year rolled over. The glitches could only be circumvented by resetting the year back to 2019 until a patch was released. Additionally, Crystal Reports 8.5 would fail to generate specific reports starting in 2020.

Parkeon parking meters in New York City and other locations were unable to accept credit cards as a form of payment starting in 2020. A workaround was implemented, but required each meter to be individually updated. In New York, the meters were not expected to be fixed until 9 January.

In Poland, 5000 cash registers stopped properly printing dates.

Suunto sport smart watches encountered an error in computing weekdays, displaying days that were two ahead of the correct day (e.g. FRI rather than WED, SAT rather than THU). For Suunto Spartan model watches, the bug was fixed with firmware release 2.8.32.

==== Classic Mac OS ====
The control panel in Classic Mac OS versions 6, 7, and 8 only allows the date to be set as high as 31 December 2019, although the system is able to continue to advance time beyond that date.

==== Microsoft Schedule+ ====
Microsoft Schedule+ version 1.0 (the version included with version 3.0 of the Microsoft Mail email client) refuses to work with years greater than 2020 or beyond because the program was designed to operate within a 100-year time window ranging from 1920 to 2019. As a result, the date can only be set as high as 31 December 2019. Microsoft has stated that this was by design.

=== 2021 ===
Samsung users reported that phones running on the One UI 3.0 update or Android 11 lost access to the battery and charging statistics starting in 2021. Affected devices would not report usage statistics, thus leaving those sections blank.

=== 2022 ===
Dates that are stored in the format yymmddhhMM converted to a signed 32-bit integer overflowed on 1 January 2022, since 2^{31} = 2,147,483,648, and a number larger than 2,200,000,000 could thus not be represented. Notably affected was the malware-scanning component update numbers of Microsoft Exchange, which appear to be used for a mathematical check to determine the latest update.

Honda and Acura cars manufactured between 2004 and 2012 containing GPS navigation systems incorrectly displayed the year as 2002. This problem was due to an overflow on the GPS epoch. The issue was resolved on 17 August 2022.

=== 2024 ===
Payment card readers at petrol pumps in New Zealand were unable to handle the leap year and were unable to properly dispense gasoline.

Two video games, EA Sports WRC and Theatrhythm Final Bar Line, also suffered issues related to the leap year, with the former crashing when trying to load the game and the latter claiming that the save data was corrupted. Both games had to be set to the following day of 1 March 2024 to properly work.

In December 2024, a 30-year-old bug was found in all versions of HCL Notes. When the server is started on or after 13 December 2024, an overflow would prevent the mail router from loading its configuration, and so no mail is delivered. Patches were released on the next day for all supported versions.

=== 2025 ===
In Japan, some older computer systems using the Japanese calendar that have not been updated still count years according to the Shōwa era. In those systems, year 2025 corresponds to Shōwa 100, which can cause problems if the software assumes two digits for the year.

In Spain, all Talgo AVRIL class trains stopped operating on 1 January 2025 due to a date handling bug in the battery charging module, causing delays and cancellations as passengers were relocated in other rolling stock. A fix was deployed by the next day, recovering regular service.

A bug in the date command from uutils, a Rust rewrite of the GNU Core Utilities, caused automatic updates in Ubuntu 25.10 to stop working.

=== 2026 ===
The system time on the Xbox 360 console (released in 2005) can only be advanced until 23:59 on 31 December 2025. The system will continue to advance into 2026 and beyond via Xbox Live connectivity; however, users cannot set the system date past this point due to software limitation within the Microsoft dashboard.

Older Kodak digital cameras (especially models from before the introduction of the Pixpro series) exhibit similar behaviour.

== Near future ==
=== 2028 ===
Some legacy systems store their year as a single-byte offset from 1900, which gives a range of 255 (8 bits) and allows dates up to 2155 to be safely represented. However, not all systems use an unsigned byte: some have been mistakenly coded with a signed byte which only allows a range of 127 years, meaning that the date field in the software will be incorrect after 2027 and can cause unpredictable behaviour. Several pieces of optical-disc software that operate using the ISO 9660 format are affected by this.

During the late 1970s, on Data General Nova and Eclipse systems, the World Computer Corporation (doing credit union applications) created a date format with a 16-bit date field, which used seven bits for the year, four bits for the month, and five bits for the day. This allowed dates to be directly comparable using unsigned functions. Some systems, including HP 3000, still use this format, although a patch has been developed by outside consultants.

=== 2032 ===
Palm OS uses both signed integers with the 1970 epoch, as well as unsigned integers with the 1904 epoch, for different system functions, such as for system clock, and file dates (see PDB format). While this should result in Palm OS being susceptible to the 2038 problem, Palm OS also uses a 7-bit field for storing the year value, with a different epoch counting from 1904, resulting in a maximum year of 2031, 127 years from 1904.

=== 2036 ===
The Network Time Protocol has an overflow issue related to the Year 2038 problem, which manifests itself at 06:28:16 UTC on 7 February 2036, rather than 2038. The 64-bit timestamps used by NTP consist of a 32-bit part for seconds and a 32-bit part for fractional second, giving NTP a time scale that rolls over every 2^{32} seconds (136 years) and a theoretical resolution of 2^{−32} second (233 picoseconds). NTP uses an epoch of 1 January 1900. The first rollover occurs in 2036, prior to the UNIX year 2038 problem.

The same issue also affects some LISP implementations.

=== 2038 ===
==== Unix time rollover ====
Animated illustration of the Year 2038 problem as it could occur on 19 January 2038 at 03:14:07.

The original implementation of the Unix operating system stored system time as a 32-bit signed integer representing the number of seconds past the Unix epoch (1 January 1970, 00:00:00 UTC). This value will roll over after 19 January 2038, 03:14:07 UTC, which is 2^{31} − 1 = 2,147,483,647 seconds since the epoch. This problem has been addressed in most modern Unix and Unix-like operating systems by using 64-bit signed integers, although individual applications, protocols, and file formats must be changed as well.

==== Windows C runtime library ====
Like the Unix time rollover issue, the 32-bit version of gmtime in the C runtime libraries on Windows has a similar problem.

This problem has already manifested in Oracle's Access Manager version 10.1.4.3 for Windows. The Identity Console component sets a cookie containing UI preferences with an expiry of 500,000,000 seconds in the future (approximately 16 years). This is beyond 19 January 2038 and so it throws an exception for certain search activities after 02:20:48 UTC on 17 March 2022 because the gmtime_r() call cannot convert the number provided to a date to write to the cookie. Despite the age of the software (18 June 2009), Oracle issued a patch number 33983548 on 6 April 2022.

==== Third GPS rollover ====
The third GPS week number rollover will occur at 20 November 2038, at 23:59:37 UTC.

=== 2040 ===
Mac computers until macOS X Snow Leopard stored time in their real-time clocks (RTCs) and HFS filesystems as an unsigned 32-bit number of seconds since 00:00:00 on 1 January 1904. After 06:28:15 on 6 February 2040, (i.e. 2^{32} − 1 seconds from the epoch), this will wrap around to 1904; further to this, HFS+, formerly the default filesystem for most Apple computers, is also affected. Apple File System, which replaces HFS and HFS+, resolves this issue.

ProDOS, which runs on Apple II computers, only supports two-digit year numbers. To avoid Y2K issues, Apple issued a technical note stating that the year number was to represent 1940–2039. Software for the platform may incorrectly display dates beginning in 2040, though a third-party effort is underway to update ProDOS and application software to support years up to 4095.

=== 2042 ===
On 18 September 2042, the Time of Day Clock (TODC) on the IBM System/370 line of IBM mainframes and its successors, including the current IBM Z series, will roll over.

Older TODCs were implemented as a 64-bit count of 2^{−12} microsecond (0.244 ns) units, and the standard base was 1 January 1900, UT. In July 1999 the extended TODC clock was announced, which extended the clock to the right (that is, the extended bits are less significant than the original bits). The actual resolution depends on the model, but the format is consistent, and will, therefore, roll over after 2^{52} microseconds.

The TODC value is accessible to user mode programs and is often used for timing and for generating unique IDs for events.

While IBM has defined and implemented a longer (128-bit) hardware format on recent machines, which extends the timer on both ends by at least 8 additional bits, many programs continue to rely on the 64-bit format which remains as an accessible subset of the longer timer.

=== 2048 ===
Maintenance Plan Scheduling in the ERP system SAP S/4HANA supports only finish dates up to 19 January 2048, (24,855 days from 1 January 1980, corresponding to 2^{31} seconds rounded down to full days). This concerns the production, maintenance, and inspection planning tools. This issue has been patched in newer updates, supporting dates up to the year 9999.

==== Fourth GPS rollover ====
The GPS week number rollover will occur for the fourth time at 23:59:41 on 7 July 2058.

=== 2069 ===
According to the Single UNIX Specification for parsing two-digit years using strptime(), "values in the range [69, 99] shall refer to years 1969 to 1999 inclusive and values in the range [00, 68] shall refer to years 2000 to 2068 inclusive", meaning that, when parsed by strptime(), the two-digit year "69" would be interpreted as 1969 rather than 2069.

== Distant future (more than 50 years from now) ==
=== 2079 ===
==== Days 32,768 and 65,536 ====
Programs that store dates as the number of days since an arbitrary date (or epoch) are vulnerable to roll-over or wrap-around effects if the values are not wide enough to allow the date values to span a sufficiently long time range expected for the application. Signed 16-bit binary values roll over after 32,768 (2^{15}) days from the epoch date, producing negative values. Some mainframe systems experienced software failures because they had encoded dates as the number of days since 1 January 1900, which produced unexpected negative day numbers on the roll-over date of 18 September 1989. Similarly, unsigned 16-bit binary days counts overflow after 65,536 (2^{16}) days, which are truncated to zero values. For software using an epoch of 1 January 1900, this will occur on 6 June 2079.

=== 2080 ===
Some (if not all) Nokia phones that run Series 40 (such as the Nokia X2-00) only support dates up to 31 December 2079, and thus will be unable to display dates after this. One workaround is to use the year 1996, 2024, or 2052 in lieu of 2080 (as compatible leap years) to display the correct day of the week, date and month on the main screen.

Many IBM PC and DOS systems store the year internally as a two-digit value since 1980, like many RTCs, and these will roll over after 31 December 2079.

=== 2100 ===
MS-DOS and Windows file date API and conversion functions (such as INT 21h/AH=2Ah) officially support dates up to 31 December 2099 (even though the underlying FAT filesystem would theoretically support dates up to 2107). Hence, DOS-based operating systems, as well as applications that convert other formats to the FAT/DOS format, may show unexpected behavior starting 1 January 2100.

Likewise, the Nintendo DS, GameCube, and PlayStation 4 only allow users to set dates up to the year 2099. In the case of the Nintendo DS, the system will not advance time beyond 31 December 2099, whereas the GameCube and PS4 will still roll over into 2100 and beyond, even though users of those game consoles cannot manually input the date and time that far out.

==== 2100 not being a leap year ====
Another problem will emerge at the end of 28 February 2100, since 2100 is not a leap year. As many common implementations of the leap years are incomplete or are overly simplified (simply checking if the year is divisible by 4), they may erroneously assume 2100 to be a leap year, causing the date to roll over from 28 February 2100 to 29 February 2100, instead of 1 March 2100.

The DS3231 hardware RTC suffers from the year 2100 problem, because it uses two digits to store the year. 2200 and 2300 will not be leap years either, making it possible for the problem to recur.

=== 2106 ===
Many existing file formats, communications protocols, and application interfaces employ a variant of the Unix time_t date format, storing the number of seconds since the Unix epoch (midnight UTC, 1 January 1970) as an unsigned 32-bit binary integer. Notably:

- Version 3 of the SFTP protocol. Specifically, OpenSSH implementations of SFTP (including the scp client).
- Bitcoin

This value will roll over on 7 February 2106 at 06:28:16 UTC. That is, at this time the number of seconds since 1 January 1970 is FFFFFFFF in hex.

This storage representation problem is independent of programs that internally store and operate on system times as 64-bit signed integer values.

=== 2108 ===
The date timestamps stored in FAT filesystems, originally introduced with 86-DOS 0.42 in 1981 and carried over into MS-DOS, PC DOS, DR-DOS etc., will overflow at the end of 31 December 2107. The last modification date stamp (and with DELWATCH 2.0+ also the file deletion date stamp, and since DOS 7.0+ optionally also the last access date stamp and creation date stamp), are stored in the directory entry with the year represented as an unsigned seven bit number (0–127), relative to 1980, and thereby unable to indicate any dates in the year 2108 and beyond. The API functions defined to retrieve these dates officially only support dates up to 31 December 2099.

This will also affect ZIP files, as they use FAT file modification timestamps internally.

=== 2137 ===
GPS dates are expressed as a week number and a day-of-week number, with the week number initially using a ten-bit value and modernised GPS navigation messages using a 13-bit field. Ten-bit systems would roll over every 1024 weeks (about 19.6 years) after Sunday 6 January 1980 (the GPS epoch), and 13-bit systems roll over every 8192 weeks. Thirteen-bit systems will roll over to zero in 2137.

=== 2248 ===
RISC OS stores dates as centiseconds (hundredths of a second) since 1 January 1900 in five bytes (40 bits). These timestamps are used internally and exposed in file metadata (load and exec addresses). This value will overflow on 3 June 2248 at 06:57:57.75 UTC.

=== 2262 ===
Some high-resolution timekeeping systems count nanoseconds since 1 January 1970 using a 64-bit signed integer, which will overflow on 11 April 2262 at 23:47:16 UTC. The Go programming language's UnixNano API is one example. Other examples include the Timestamp object in Python pandas, the chrono class in C++ when set to nanosecond precision, and the QEMU timers.

=== 2286 ===
Systems that use a string of length 10 characters to record Unix time may have problems reporting times beyond 20 November 2286, at 17:46:39 UTC, 10^{10} seconds after the Unix epoch.

=== 2446 ===
In ext4, the default file system for many Linux distributions, the bottom two bits of {a,c,m}time_extra are used to extend the {a,c,m}time fields, deferring the year 2038 problem to the year 2446. Within this "extra" 32-bit field, the lower two bits are used to extend the seconds field to a signed 34-bit integer; the upper 30 bits are used to provide nanosecond timestamp accuracy. Therefore, timestamps will not overflow until May 2446.

=== Years 4000, 8000, etc. ===
On time scales of thousands of years, the Gregorian calendar will fall behind the astronomical seasons. This is because the Earth's speed of rotation is gradually slowing down, which makes each day slightly longer over time (see tidal acceleration and leap second) while the year maintains a more uniform duration.

In the 19th century, Sir John Herschel proposed a modification to the Gregorian calendar with 969 leap days every 4,000 years, instead of 970 leap days that the Gregorian calendar would insert over the same period. This would reduce the average year to 365.24225 days. Herschel's proposal would make the year 4000, and multiples thereof, common instead of leap. While this modification has often been proposed since, it has never been officially adopted.

While most software (including Excel, JavaScript, and R) currently recognizes 4000 and 8000 as leap years (as they are divisible by 400), SAS has adopted the "4000 year rule". Thus, with the current software, date conversions between SAS and other software will desynchronize after 28 February 4000.

=== 4501 ===
Microsoft Outlook uses 1 January 4501 as a placeholder for "none" or "empty".

=== Year 10,000 ===
The year AD 10000 will be the first Gregorian year with five digits. Systems that only allow up to four digits for the year will have problems dealing with all future years that are powers of 10, as well as dates before the 10th millennium BC.

==== Examples ====
As of 2026, the maximum supported date for calculation by the spreadsheet program Microsoft Excel is 31 December 9999.

The optical disc file systems ISO 9660 and UDF have date ranges that end with the year 9999.

=== Year 10,889 ===
UUID version 7 uses a 48-bit timestamp which will overflow in 10889 AD.

=== Years 29,228, 30,828, and 31,197 ===
In the C# programming language, or any language that uses .NET, the DateTime structure stores absolute timestamps as the number of tenth-microseconds (10^{−7} s, known as "ticks") since midnight (00:00:00.0000000 UTC) on 1 January 1 AD in the proleptic Gregorian calendar, which will overflow a signed 64-bit integer on 14 September 29,228 at 02:48:05.4775808 UTC. Timekeeping structures in many of Microsoft's applications and services have 100-nanosecond resolution, such as Power Automate's TIME data type, the GETCURRENTTICKS query in Azure Cosmos DB, and the TimeSpan parameter in various Windows PowerShell commands, and these will all face similar issues. However, dates past 31 December 9999 at 23:59:59.9999999 UTC are considered "unsupported" and time operations will intentionally throw errors when calculations would otherwise result in dates later than 9999.

In Windows operating systems, the FILETIME structure stores the number of tenth-microseconds since midnight (00:00:00.0000000 UTC) on 1 January 1601 in the proleptic Gregorian calendar as a signed 64-bit integer. This value will overflow on 14 September 30,828 at 02:48:05 UTC, after which Windows will no longer be able to accept dates and will display "invalid system time" errors.

Similarly, the GETCURRENTTICKSSTATIC commands in Cosmos DB returns the number of 100-nanosecond ticks since the Unix epoch of midnight (00:00:00.0000000 UTC) on 1 January 1970, which will roll over on 14 September 31197 at 02:48:05.

=== Years 32,768 and 65,536 ===
Programs that process years as 16-bit values may encounter problems dealing with either the year 32,768 or 65,536, depending on whether the value is treated as a signed or unsigned integer.

For systems using signed 16-bit integers, years after 32,767 may be interpreted as negative numbers, beginning with −32,768 which may be displayed as 32,768 AD. On systems using unsigned 16-bit integers, the problem is more likely to manifest itself by the year 65,536 showing up as year 0, or the year 65,537 wrapping back around to year 1.

=== Year 33,658 ===
Static library archives built by the ar Unix command store timestamps as an ASCII string containing a decimal number of seconds past the Unix epoch, with a limit of 12 ASCII characters. This value will roll over on 01:46:40 UTC on 27 September 33,658, one trillion seconds after the Unix epoch.

=== Year 100,000 ===
The year 100,000 will be the first Gregorian year with six digits.

=== Year 275,760 ===
JavaScript's Date API stores dates as the number of milliseconds since 1 January 1970. Dates have a range of ±100,000,000 days from the epoch, meaning that programs written in JavaScript using the Date API cannot store dates past 13 September, AD 275,760.

=== Year 292,277,026,596 ===
Systems that store Unix time in seconds using signed 64-bit integers can represent dates and times up until 15:30:08 UTC on Sunday, 4 December, AD 292,277,026,596. However, this year is so far in the future (well beyond the likely lifespan of the Earth, the Sun, and even past some predictions of the lifetime of the universe) that it is mainly referenced as a matter of theoretical interest, a joke, or an indication that earlier versions like the year 2038 problem cannot be truly "solved" forever.

== Relative time overflow ==
=== Microsoft ===
In Microsoft Windows 7, Windows Server 2003, Windows Server 2008, and Windows Vista, TCP connection start information was stored in hundredths of a second, using a 32-bit unsigned integer, which caused TCP connections to fail after 497 days.

Windows 95 and Windows 98 had a problem with rollovers in a virtual device driver, VTDAPI.VXD, which used unsigned 32-bit integers to measure system runtime in milliseconds; this value would overflow after 49.7 days, causing systems to freeze.

Until version 6.0, Microsoft's .NET platform had a bug that caused threadpool hill-climbing to fail periodically after 49.7 days due to an overflow while handling milliseconds since startup.

=== Boeing ===
Boeing 787 aircraft have had at least two software issues related to time storage. In 2015, an error was reported where system uptime was stored in hundredths of a second, using a signed 32-bit integer; this value would overflow after 248 days, after which the onboard generator control systems would crash, causing aircraft to lose power.

In 2020, the Federal Aviation Administration issued an airworthiness directive requiring 787 operators to power their aircraft down completely before reaching 51 days of uptime, since otherwise systems will begin to display misleading data.

=== Arduino ===
The Arduino platform provides relative time via the millis() function. This function returns an unsigned 32-bit integer representing "milliseconds since startup", which will roll over every 49 days. By default, this is the only timing source available in the platform and programs need to take special care to handle rollovers. Internally, millis() is based on counting timer interrupts. Certain powersave modes disable interrupts and therefore stop the counter from advancing during sleep.

== Historic year problems ==
Also, for historic years there might be problems when handling historic events, for example:

- Year 0 problem
- Year 1000 problem
- Year 1414 problem
- Year 1582 problem
- Year 1900 problem

== See also ==
- Heisenbug – Software bug that seems to change when debugging
- Long Now Foundation – American nonprofit organization
