= GPS week number rollover =

Event occurring every 1024 weeks

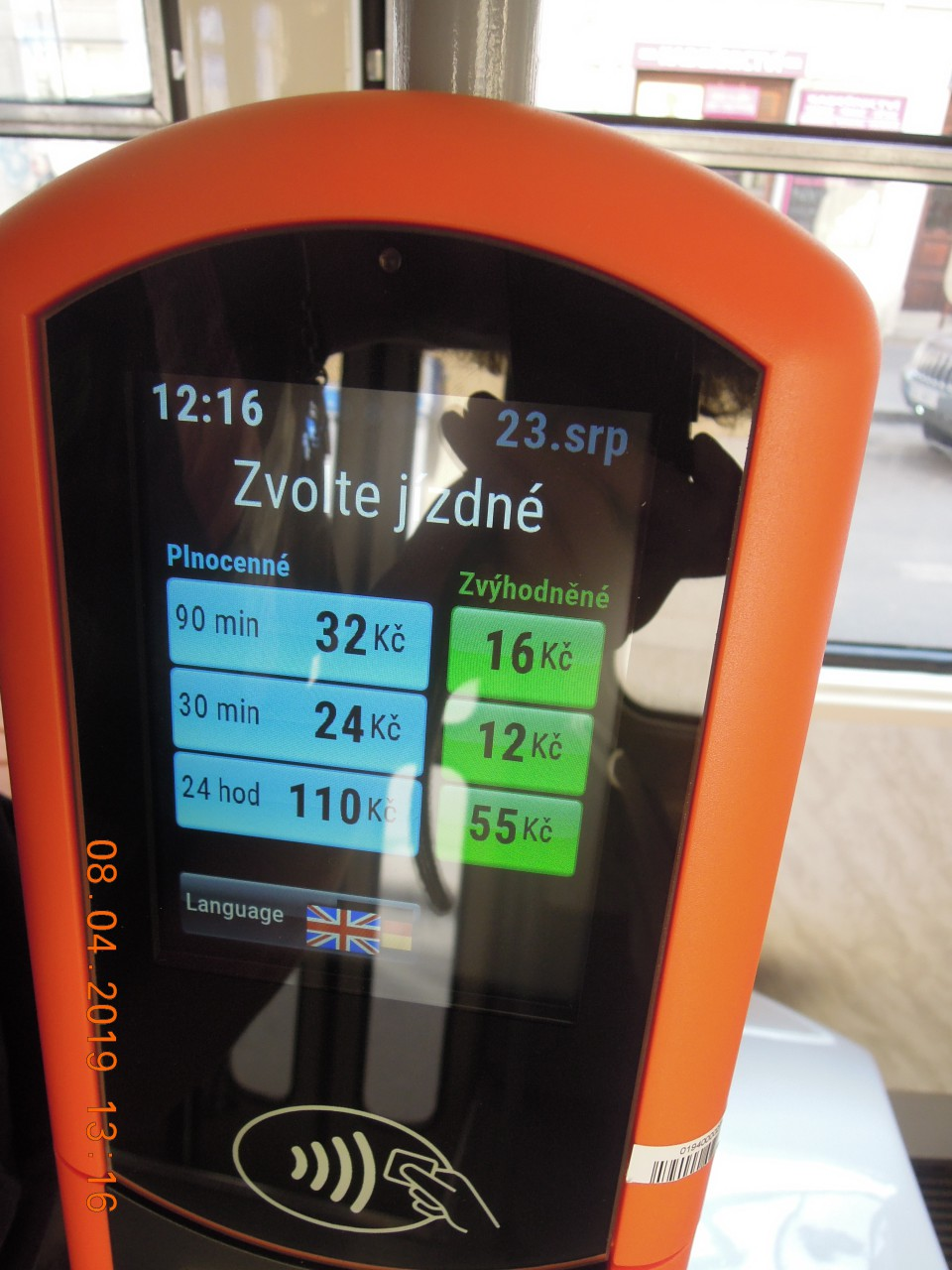
- Ticket terminal in Prague, showing August 23 as the date (instead of April 8) after the 2019 GPS week number rollover
- Date: Every 1,024 weeks (NAV), starting 1999 August 21; Every 8,192 weeks (CNAV), starting 2137 January 5

The GPS week number rollover is a phenomenon that happens every 1,024 weeks, or about 19.6 years. The Global Positioning System (GPS) message broadcasts a date which includes a week number counter stored in only ten binary digits, whose range is therefore 0–1,023, in the legacy NAV (L1) message format. After 1,023, an integer overflow causes the internal value to roll over, changing to zero again. Software that is not coded to anticipate the rollover to zero may stop working or could be moved back in time by a multiple of approximately 20 years. GPS is not only used for positioning, but also for accurate time. Time is used to accurately synchronize payment operations, broadcasters, and mobile operators.

Since the mid 2010s, new GPS satellites have been broadcasting a new generation of civilian GPS signals known as CNAV (L1C, L2C, L5). This new format has a 13-bit week number counter in the range of 0–8191. It would roll over about every 157 years.

== 1999 occurrence ==
The first rollover took place midnight (UTC) August 21 to 22, 1999.

NavCen issued an advisory prior to the rollover stating that some devices would not tolerate the rollover. Because of the relatively limited use of GPS during the 1999 rollover, disruption was minor.

== 2019 occurrence ==
The second rollover occurred on the night of April 6 to 7, 2019, when GPS Week 2,047, represented as 1,023 in the counter, advanced and rolled over to 0 within the counter. The United States Department of Homeland Security, the International Civil Aviation Organization, and others issued a warning about this event.

A nationwide telecoms outage for the Telstra network in Australia on July 8, 2026 was root-caused to the replacement of a faulty power supply, where the replacement system on startup incorrectly interpreted the current GPS date as being 2006.

Products known to have been affected by the 2019 rollover include Honeywell's flight management and navigation software that caused delays for a KLM flight and cancellations for numerous flights in China because the technicians failed to patch the software. Furthermore, the New York City Wireless Network (NYCWiN), a private network for New York City's municipal services, crashed. Other products that were affected by the rollover include cellphones that were sold in 2013 or earlier, certain types of older Vaisala radiosonde groundstations, suspending launches at some stations for up to two weeks, NOAA's weather buoys, many scientific instruments, and consumer GPS navigation devices.

Prior to return to normal standard time from daylight saving time during the morning of November 3, 2019, Apple issued a warning to owners of iPhone and iPad devices sold before 2012 to update or risk losing Internet connectivity.

Some Furuno GPS models had an internal rollover on January 2, 2022. If the equipment was not updated with the latest software version, the equipment's date would no longer be displayed correctly.

Honda and Acura cars manufactured between 2004 and 2012 containing GPS navigation systems incorrectly displayed the year 2022 as 2002, with a time offset by several minutes. This problem was due to an overflow on the GPS epoch.

All Porsche models with PCM2.1 are also affected according to bulletin #1904 released by Porsche on December 20, 2019.

Users of the GoPro Karma camera drone reported that their drones were grounded in early January 2020 due to a GPS-related glitch. GoPro subsequently revealed that the glitch was caused by the GPS week number rollover phenomenon and that they were working on a firmware update to fix the issue.

== Future occurrences ==
=== 2038 occurrence ===
The third rollover will occur between November 20 and 21, 2038. This is unrelated to the Year 2038 problem, which will occur in January of that year.

=== 2137 occurrence ===
The above rollovers are due to a ten-bit week number; the more recent CNAV protocol, successor to the original NAV protocol, uses thirteen-bit week numbers, which amounts to a 157-year cycle; therefore, using the same epoch of 1980, the first rollover will not be until 2137.

== Other satellite navigation systems ==
The basic principle of week numbering and rollover applies to most satellite navigation systems.

- Galileo uses a 12-bit week numbering scheme starting on 1999-08-21 23:59:47 UTC. It rolls over every 4,096 weeks, with the first rollover occurring on February 19, 2087.
- BeiDou uses a 13-bit week number starting on the midnight of January 1, 2006. The first rollover would happen on January 2, 2163.
- GLONASS uses a year-day format, which is not affected by week number change.
- QZSS uses the same date format as GPS for its NAV and CNAV messages, with the same roll-over dates.

Due to the different formats and starting epochs for each date system, a receiver capable of receiving the date from multiple satellite navigation systems is less likely to be confused by week number roll-over.

== See also ==
- Time formatting and storage bugs
- Structure of the time-encoding components of GPS signals, NAV and CNAV versions
