= Col Stringer =

Australian author

Col Stringer is the Australian President of the International Convention of Faith Ministries International. He is an author of Christian books and is a speaker and humourist who grew up in the Northern Territory of Australia.

== Background ==
Col Stringer was raised in Australia's Northern Territory. His father was a professional hunter.

Stringer was awarded the Mariner Fishing Writer of the Year award (Australia) (1979). He also won a Swedish Gold Medal for a world record shark capture and was featured in an outdoor documentary film for Australian and American television. Col hosted an outdoor and fishing TV program and has written 10 books on fishing, hunting and wildlife.

== Ministry ==
Col Stringer Ministries is an Australian-based organisation. As Christian evangelists, Col and his wife Jan travel to many parts of the globe preaching the gospel. Col's background of wildlife and his sense of humour have earned him the title of "Pastor Crocodile Dundee". He is also the author of 20 Christian books. Two of his books, 800 Horsemen and Fighting McKenzie, were voted number 12 and 29 in the Australian Broadcasting Commissions ‘100 All-time favourite books’.

== Bibliography ==
- 800 Horsemen
- Fighting McKenzie
