= MacOS High Sierra =

2017 operating system version

macOS High Sierra
- Version of the macOS operating system

- Developer: Apple
- OS family: Macintosh; Unix
- Working state: No longer supported
- Source model: Closed, with open source components
- General availability: September 25, 2017; 9 years ago
- Latest release: 10.13.6 Security Update 2020-006 (17G14042) (November 12, 2020; 6 years ago) [±]
- Update method: Mac App Store
- Supported platforms: x86-64
- Kernel type: Hybrid (XNU)
- License: APSL and Apple EULA
- Preceded by: macOS Sierra
- Succeeded by: macOS Mojave
- Official website: MacOS High Sierra (archived at Wayback Machine)
- Tagline: Your Mac. Elevated.

Support status
- Obsolete, unsupported as of November 12, 2020. iTunes is no longer being updated, but is able to download driver updates to sync to newer devices.

macOS High Sierra (version 10.13) is the fourteenth major release of macOS, Apple's desktop operating system for Macintosh computers. macOS High Sierra was announced at the WWDC 2017 on June 5, 2017, and was released on September 25, 2017. The name "High Sierra" refers to the High Sierra region in California. Its name signified its goal to be a refinement of the previous macOS version, macOS Sierra, focused on performance improvements and technical updates rather than features. This makes it similar to previous macOS releases Snow Leopard, Mavericks and El Capitan. Among the apps with notable changes are Photos and Safari.

macOS High Sierra is the final version of macOS to support the Unibody iMac and the Polycarbonate Unibody MacBook, as its successor, macOS Mojave, drops support for the late 2011 and final models.

macOS High Sierra is the first to run on a Mac with a T2 Security chip.

== System requirements ==
All Macs that supported macOS Sierra support macOS High Sierra.

- iMac (Late 2009 or later)
- MacBook (Late 2009 or later)
- MacBook Air (Late 2010 or later)
- MacBook Pro (Mid 2010 or later)
- Mac Mini (Mid 2010 or later)
- iMac Pro (2017)
- Mac Pro (Mid 2010 or later)

macOS High Sierra requires at least 2 GB of RAM and 20.12 GB of available disk space.

It is possible to install High Sierra on many older Macintosh computers that are not officially supported by Apple. This requires using a patch to modify the install image.

== Changes ==
=== Default wallpaper ===
The default desktop picture depicts North Lake in the High Sierra biome.

=== System ===
==== Apple File System ====
Apple File System (APFS) replaces HFS Plus as the default file system in macOS for the first time with High Sierra. It supports 64‑bit inode numbers, is designed for flash memory, and is designed to speed up common tasks like duplicating a file and finding the size of a folder's contents. It also has built‑in encryption, crash‑safe protections, and simplified data backup on the go.

==== Metal 2 ====
Metal, Apple's low-level graphics API, has been updated to Metal 2. It includes virtual reality and machine-learning features, as well as support for external GPUs. The system's windowing system, Quartz Compositor, supports Metal 2.

==== Media ====
macOS High Sierra adds support for High Efficiency Video Coding (HEVC), with hardware acceleration where available, as well as support for High Efficiency Image File Format (HEIF). Macs with the Intel Kaby Lake processor offer hardware support for Main 10 profile 10-bit hardware decoding, those with the Intel Skylake processor support Main profile 8-bit hardware decoding, and those with AMD Radeon 400 series graphics also support full HEVC decoding. However, whenever an Intel IGP is present, the frameworks will only direct requests to Intel IGP. In addition, audio codecs FLAC and Opus are also supported, but not in iTunes.

HEVC hardware acceleration requires a Mac with a sixth-generation Intel processor or newer (late 2015 27-inch iMac, mid 2017 21.5-inch iMac, early 2016 MacBook, late 2016 MacBook Pro or iMac Pro).

==== Other ====
In High Sierra, kernel extensions ("kexts") require explicit approval by the user before being able to run.

Certain UI elements, such as the Low Battery notification and App Store icon, were redesigned to either be based on the iOS 11 equivalents or match with the overall less detailed design used in all releases since Yosemite.

The time service ntpd was replaced with timed for the time synchronization.

The FTP and telnet command line programs were removed.

Caching Server, File Sharing Server, and Time Machine Server, features that were previously part of macOS Server, are now provided as part of the OS.

A new “now playing” widget has been added to the Notification Center, based on the music Lock Screen toggle in iOS 11.

The screen can now be locked using the shortcut Cmd+Ctrl+Q. The ability to lock screen using a menu bar shortcut activated in Keychain Access preferences has now been removed.

The 10.13.4 update added support for external graphics processors for Macs equipped with Thunderbolt 3 ports. The update discontinued support for external graphics processors in 2015 or older Macs, equipped with Thunderbolt 1 and 2 ports.

Starting with 10.13.4, when a 32-bit app is opened, users get a one-time warning about its future incompatibility with the macOS operating system.

=== Applications ===
==== Final Cut Pro 7 ====
Apple announced the original Final Cut Studio suite of programs will not work on High Sierra. Media professionals that depend on any of those programs were advised to create a double boot drive to their computer.

==== Photos ====
macOS High Sierra gives Photos an updated sidebar and new editing tools. Photos synchronizes tagged People with iOS 11.

==== Mail ====
Mail has improved Spotlight search with Top Hits. Mail also uses 35% less storage space due to optimizations, and Mail's compose window can now be used in split-screen mode.

==== Safari ====
macOS High Sierra includes Safari 11. Safari 11 has a new "Intelligent Tracking Prevention" feature that uses machine learning to block third parties from tracking the user's actions. Safari can also block auto playing videos from playing. The "Reader Mode" can be set to always-on. Safari 11 also supports WebAssembly. The last version of Safari that High Sierra supports is 13.1.2. This version has known security issues.

==== Notes ====
The Notes app includes the ability to add tables to notes, and notes can be pinned to the top of the list. The version number was incremented to 4.5.

==== Siri ====
In High Sierra, Siri uses a more natural and expressive voice. It also uses machine learning to understand the user better. Siri synchronizes information across iOS and Mac devices so the Siri experience is the same regardless of the product being used.

==== Messages ====
The release of macOS High Sierra 10.13.5 (and iOS 11.4) introduced support for Messages in iCloud. This feature allows messages to sync across all devices using the same iCloud account. When messages are deleted they are deleted on each device as well, and messages stored in the cloud do not take up local storage on the device anymore. In order to use the feature, the user has to enable two-factor authentication for their Apple ID.

== Reception ==
Roman Loyola, the senior editor of Macworld, gave High Sierra a provisionally positive review in September 2017, calling it an "incremental update worthy of your time, eventually." Loyola expressed that the product's most significant draw was its security features, and that beyond this, the most beneficial changes lay in its future potential, saying it "doesn't have a lot of new features that will widen your eyes in excitement. But a lot of the changes are in the background and under the hood, and they lay a foundation for better things to come."

=== Problems ===
macOS High Sierra 10.13.0 and 10.13.1 have a critical vulnerability that allowed an attacker to become a root user by entering "root" as a username, and not entering a password, when logging in. This was fixed in the Security Update 2017-001 for macOS High Sierra v10.13.1.

When it was first launched, it was discovered that the WindowServer process had a memory leak, leading to much slower graphics performance and lagging animations, probably due to some last-minute changes in Metal 2. This was fixed in macOS 10.13.1.

macOS High Sierra 10.13.4 had an error that caused DisplayLink to stop working for external monitors, allowing only one monitor to be extended. When using two external monitors, they could only be mirrored. Alban Rampon, the Senior Product Manager for DisplayLink, stated on December 24, 2018, that the company was working with Apple to resolve the issue.

== Release history ==
Version	Build	Date	Darwin version	Release notes	Standalone download
10.13	17A365	September 25, 2017	17.0.0	Original Mac App Store release About the security content of macOS High Sierra 10.13	—N/a
10.13	17A405	October 5, 2017	17.0.0	About the security content of macOS High Sierra 10.13 Supplemental Update	macOS 10.13 Supplemental
10.13.1	17B48	October 31, 2017	17.2.0	About the macOS High Sierra 10.13.1 Update; About the security content of macOS High Sierra 10.13.1	macOS High Sierra 10.13.1 update
10.13.1	17B1002	November 29, 2017	17.2.0	About the security content of Security Update 2017-001	Security Update 2017-001 macOS High Sierra v10.13.1
10.13.1	17B1003	November 29, 2017	17.2.0	About the security content of Security Update 2017-001	Security Update 2017-001 macOS High Sierra v10.13.1
10.13.2	17C88	December 6, 2017	17.3.0	About the macOS High Sierra 10.13.2 Update; About the security content of macOS High Sierra 10.13.2	macOS High Sierra 10.13.2 Update macOS High Sierra 10.13.2 Combo Update
10.13.2	17C89	December 6, 2017	17.3.0	About the macOS High Sierra 10.13.2 Update; About the security content of macOS High Sierra 10.13.2	macOS High Sierra 10.13.2 Update macOS High Sierra 10.13.2 Combo Update
10.13.2	17C205	January 8, 2018	17.3.0	About the security content of macOS High Sierra 10.13.2 Supplemental Update	macOS High Sierra 10.13.2 Supplemental
10.13.2	17C2205	January 8, 2018	17.3.0	About the security content of macOS High Sierra 10.13.2 Supplemental Update	macOS High Sierra 10.13.2 Supplemental
10.13.3	17D47	January 23, 2018	17.4.0	About the macOS High Sierra 10.13.3 Update; About the security content of macOS High Sierra 10.13.3	macOS High Sierra 10.13.3 Update macOS High Sierra 10.13.3 Combo Update
10.13.3	17D2047	January 23, 2018	17.4.0	About the macOS High Sierra 10.13.3 Update; About the security content of macOS High Sierra 10.13.3	macOS High Sierra 10.13.3 Update macOS High Sierra 10.13.3 Combo Update
10.13.3	17D102	February 19, 2018	17.4.0	About the security content of macOS High Sierra 10.13.3 Supplemental Update	macOS High Sierra 10.13.3 Supplemental
10.13.3	17D2102	February 19, 2018	17.4.0	About the security content of macOS High Sierra 10.13.3 Supplemental Update	macOS High Sierra 10.13.3 Supplemental
10.13.4	17E199	March 29, 2018	17.5.0	About the macOS High Sierra 10.13.4 Update; About the security content of macOS High Sierra 10.13.4	macOS High Sierra 10.13.4 Update macOS High Sierra 10.13.4 Combo Update
10.13.4	17E202	April 24, 2018	17.5.0	About the security content of Security Update 2018-001	Security Update 2018-001 macOS High Sierra v10.13.4
10.13.5	17F77	June 1, 2018	17.6.0	About the macOS High Sierra 10.13.5 Update; About the security content of macOS High Sierra 10.13.5	macOS High Sierra 10.13.5 Update macOS High Sierra 10.13.5 Combo Update
10.13.6	17G65	July 9, 2018	17.7.0	About the macOS High Sierra 10.13.6 Update; About the security content of macOS High Sierra 10.13.6	macOS High Sierra 10.13.6 Update macOS High Sierra 10.13.6 Combo Update
10.13.6	17G2208	July 24, 2018	17.7.0	About the macOS High Sierra 10.13.6 Update; About the security content of macOS High Sierra 10.13.6	macOS High Sierra 10.13.6 Supplemental Update for MacBook Pro (2018)
10.13.6	17G2307	August 28, 2018	17.7.0	About the macOS High Sierra 10.13.6 Update; About the security content of macOS High Sierra 10.13.6	macOS High Sierra 10.13.6 Supplemental Update 2 for MacBook Pro (2018)
10.13.6	17G3025	October 30, 2018	17.7.0	About the security content of Security Update 2018-002 High Sierra	Security Update 2018-002 High Sierra
10.13.6	17G4015	December 5, 2018	17.7.0	About the security content of Security Update 2018-003 High Sierra	Security Update 2018-003 High Sierra
10.13.6	17G5019	January 22, 2019	17.7.0 xnu-4570.71.22~1	About the security content of Security Update 2019-001 High Sierra	Security Update 2019-001 High Sierra
10.13.6	~~17G6029~~	March 25, 2019	17.7.0	About the security content of Security Update 2019-002 High Sierra	Security Update 2019-002 High Sierra
10.13.6	17G6030	March 29, 2019	17.7.0 xnu-4570.71.35~1	About the security content of Security Update 2019-002 High Sierra	Security Update 2019-002 High Sierra
10.13.6	17G7024	May 13, 2019	17.7.0 xnu-4570.71.45~1	About the security content of Security Update 2019-003 High Sierra	Security Update 2019-003 High Sierra
10.13.6	~~17G8029~~	July 22, 2019	17.7.0	About the security content of Security Update 2019-004 High Sierra	~~Security Update 2019-004 High Sierra~~
10.13.6	17G8030	July 29, 2019	17.7.0	About the security content of Security Update 2019-004 High Sierra	~~Security Update 2019-004 High Sierra~~
10.13.6	17G8037	September 26, 2019	17.7.0 xnu-4570.71.46~1	About the security content of Security Update 2019-005 High Sierra	Security Update 2019-005 High Sierra
10.13.6	17G9016	October 29, 2019	17.7.0 xnu-4570.71.57~1	About the security content of Security Update 2019-006 High Sierra	Security Update 2019-006 High Sierra
10.13.6	17G10021	December 10, 2019	17.7.0 xnu-4570.71.63~1	About the security content of Security Update 2019-007 High Sierra	Security Update 2019-007 High Sierra
10.13.6	17G11023	January 28, 2020	17.7.0 xnu-4570.71.69~1	About the security content of Security Update 2020-001 High Sierra	Security Update 2020-001 High Sierra
10.13.6	17G12034	March 24, 2020	17.7.0 xnu-4570.71.73~1	About the security content of Security Update 2020-002 High Sierra	Security Update 2020-002 High Sierra
10.13.6	~~17G13033~~	May 26, 2020	17.7.0 xnu-4570.71.80~1	About the security content of Security Update 2020-003 High Sierra	Security Update 2020-003 High Sierra
10.13.6	17G13035	June 1, 2020	17.7.0 xnu-4570.71.80.1~1	About the security content of Security Update 2020-003 High Sierra	Security Update 2020-003 High Sierra
10.13.6	17G14019	July 15, 2020	17.7.0 xnu-4570.71.82.5~1	About the security content of Security Update 2020-004 High Sierra	Security Update 2020-004 High Sierra
10.13.6	17G14033	September 24, 2020	17.7.0 xnu-4570.71.82.6~1	About the security content of Security Update 2020-005 High Sierra	Security Update 2020-005 High Sierra
10.13.6	17G14042	November 12, 2020	17.7.0 xnu-4570.71.82.8~1	About the security content of Security Update 2020-006 High Sierra	Security Update 2020-006 High Sierra

== Timeline of Mac operating systems ==
Timeline of Mac operating systems

Preceded by macOS 10.12 (Sierra)	macOS 10.13 (High Sierra); 2017	Succeeded by macOS 10.14 (Mojave)
