= Nitz =

Nitz may refer to:

== People ==
- Karl Nitz (1932–2020), German judo athlete
- Leonard Nitz (born 1956), American track cyclist
- Jai Nitz (born 1975), American former comic book writer and creator of the Chato Santana version of El Diablo
- Michael Nitz, perpetrator of the murder of Vincent Chin
- Neal Nitz (1954–2015), American farmer and politician
- Nitin Arora, from Nitz 'N' Sony
- Paul Nitz, American paralympic sprinter

== Places ==
- Nitz, Germany

== Other ==
- NITZ, communications technology
