= Chrony =

Network Time Protocol implementation

chrony
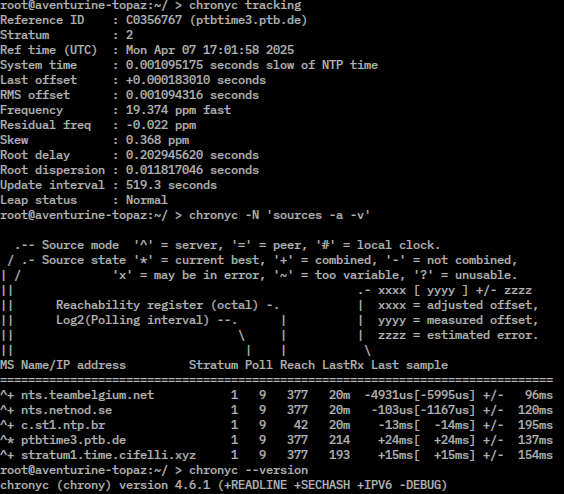
- Screenshot of chronyc
- Original author(s): Richard Curnow
- Developer(s): Miroslav Lichvar, Red Hat
- Stable release: 4.6.1 / 8 October 2024; 5 months ago
- Repository: gitlab.com/chrony/chrony.git
- Written in: C
- Operating system: Unix-like
- Type: Time synchronization
- License: GNU GPL v2
- Website: chrony-project.org

chrony is an implementation of the Network Time Protocol (NTP). It is an alternative to ntpd, a reference implementation of NTP. It runs on Unix-like operating systems (including Linux and macOS) and is released under the GNU GPL v2. It is the default NTP client and server in Red Hat Enterprise Linux 8 and SUSE Linux Enterprise Server 15, and available in many Linux distributions.

Support for Network Time Security (NTS) was added in version 4.0.

== Comparison with the reference implementation ==
In contrast to NTPsec, which is a security-focused fork of ntpd, chrony was implemented from scratch. It was designed to synchronize time even in difficult conditions such as intermittent network connections (such as laptops) and congested networks. Some improvements in this regard (compared to reference ntpd) include that it never steps (abruptly adjusts) time outside of startup, can correct for asymmetric network jitters, and can use larger clock rate adjustments on Linux to deal with a broken clock. It typically synchronizes faster and more accurately.

Unlike ntpd, it supports synchronizing the system clock via hardware timestamping (i.e. packet times on the network adapter), improving accuracy of time synchronization between machines on a LAN – to the order of 70 nanoseconds (from asymmetry), comparable to Precision Time Protocol. It also supports synchronization by manual input, so as to perform time correction within an isolated network.

chrony does not implement broadcast, multicast, and anycast modes of operation. It also does not implement the insecure "autokey" authentication. It uses external programs to drive hardware time sources (e.g. gpsd for GNSS), unlike ntpd, which has many built-in drivers.

== See also ==
- OpenNTPD
- timesyncd
