= Timed =

Software that maintains time synchronization

timed
- Operating system: macOS, FreeBSD

timed (time daemon) is an operating system program that maintains the system time in synchronization with time servers using the Time Synchronization Protocol (TSP) developed by Riccardo Gusella and Stefano Zatti. Gusella and Zatti had done earlier related work on their TEMPO algorithm. The Time Synchronization Protocol specification refers to an election algorithm and a synchronization mechanism specified in other technical reports listed as "to appear".

With the release of macOS High Sierra in 2017, timed in macOS has subsumed all time synchronization responsibilities including those of the former ntpd and timed.

== See also ==
- Network Time Protocol (NTP)
- Precision Time Protocol (IEEE 1588 PTP)
