= NITZ =

Mechanism for time synchronisation on mobile devices

Network Identity and Time Zone (NITZ) is a mechanism for provisioning local time and date, time zone and daylight saving time (DST) offset, as well as network provider identity information, to mobile devices via a wireless network.

== History ==
NITZ has been an optional part of the official GSM standard since phase 2+ release 96.

NITZ is often used to automatically update the system clock of mobile phones.

In terms of standards and other timing or network access protocols such as NTP or CDMA2000, the quality and enforcement of NITZ is weak. This standard allows the network to "transfer its current identity, universal time, DST and LTZ" but each is optional, and support across RAN vendor and operator varies. This presents a problem for device manufacturers, who are required to maintain a complex time zone database, rather than rely on the network operator. Additionally, unlike 3GPP2, which transmits GPS-sourced, millisecond resolution time via the sync channel, for NITZ, the "accuracy of the time information is in the order of minutes". The optional nature of the delivery mechanism results in issues for users in regions that don't practice daylight saving but which share a time zone with a region that does. Most modern handsets have their own internal time zone software and will automatically perform a daylight saving advance. Because the NITZ delivery is not usually periodic but dependent on the handset crossing radio network boundaries, these handsets can be displaying incorrect time for many hours or even days before a NITZ update arrives and corrects them.

== Carriers supporting NITZ ==
Initial list derived from ref:

Country	Carrier	NITZ available since	Notes
Australia	Optus	Y	
Australia	Telstra	Y	
Australia	Three	Y	
Azerbaijan	Nar	2014	
Canada	Rogers	Y	
Canada	SaskTel	Y	
China	China Mobile	Y	
Croatia	A1	Y	
Czech Republic	Telefónica O2	Y	
Czech Republic	T-Mobile	Y	
Czech Republic	Vodafone	Y	
France	Bouygues Telecom	Y	
France	Free	Y	
France	Orange	Y	
France	SFR		
Finland	DNA	Y	
Finland	Sonera	Y (pre-2000)	
Germany	Telefónica O2	2009	ref
Hong Kong	PCCW	Y	
Hong Kong	SmarTone	Y	
Hungary	T-Mobile	Y	
Italy	Wind	Y	
Malaysia	U Mobile	Y	
Mexico	Telcel	Y	
Netherlands	KPN	Y	
Netherlands	Vodafone	Y	
New Zealand	2degrees	Y	
New Zealand	Spark New Zealand	Y	
New Zealand	One New Zealand	Y	
Nigeria	MTN	Y	
Poland	T-Mobile	Y	2G and 3G
Poland	P4 Play	Y	3G only
Poland	Plus (telecommunications Poland)	Y	2G and 3G
Poland	Aero2	Y	2G and 3G
Romania	Zapp	Y	
Romania	Salt	Y	3G only
Russia	MTS	Y	
Sweden	Telia	Y	
Sweden	Telenor	Y	
Switzerland	Sunrise	Y	
Switzerland	Swisscom	Y	
Switzerland	Salt	Y	
Turkey	Turkcell	Y	
Turkey	Vodafone	Y	
Taiwan	Chunghwa Telecom	Y	
United Kingdom	Telefónica O2	Y	
United Kingdom	Vodafone	Y	ref
USA	AT&T	Y	
USA	T-Mobile	Y	
Norway	<ALL>	-	
Turkey	Türk Telekom	-	ref
Australia	Vodafone	-	
China	China Unicom	-	
Poland	Plus	-	
Germany	Telekom	-	
Germany	Vodafone	-	
Japan	SoftBank	-	
Belgium	Mobistar	-	
Belgium	Proximus	-	
Mexico	Movistar	-	
Netherlands	T-Mobile	-	
Sweden	Tele2	-	
Sweden	3	-	
United Kingdom	EE (telecommunications company)	-	
India	BSNL	-	
