= Universal Time =

Time standard based on the slowing rotation of the Earth

Universal Time (UT or UT1) is a time standard based on Earth's rotation. While originally it was mean solar time at 0° longitude, precise measurements of the Sun are difficult. Therefore, UT1 is computed from a measure of the Earth's angle with respect to the International Celestial Reference Frame (ICRF), called the Earth Rotation Angle (ERA, which serves as the replacement for Greenwich Mean Sidereal Time). UT1 is the same everywhere on Earth. UT1 is required to follow the relationship

ERA = 2π(0.7790572732640 + 1.00273781191135448 · T_{u}) radians

where T_{u} = (Julian UT1 date − 2451545.0).

== History ==
Prior to the introduction of standard time, each municipality throughout the clock-using world set its official clock, if it had one, according to the local position of the Sun (see solar time). This served adequately until the introduction of rail travel in Britain, which made it possible to travel fast enough over sufficiently long distances as to require continuous re-setting of timepieces as a train progressed in its daily run through several towns. Starting in 1847, Britain established Greenwich Mean Time (GMT), the mean solar time at Greenwich, England, to solve this problem: all clocks in Great Britain were set to this time regardless of local solar noon. (Note: Despite its mandatory use on Great Western Railway stations from 1847 and thus widespread informal adoption, it was not until the Statutes (Definition of Time) Act 1880 that it became law. The act declared that standard time in Great Britain was to be Greenwich Mean Time and standard time in Ireland was to be Dublin time.) Using telescopes, GMT was calibrated to the mean solar time at the prime meridian through the Royal Observatory, Greenwich. Chronometers or telegraphy were used to synchronize these clocks.

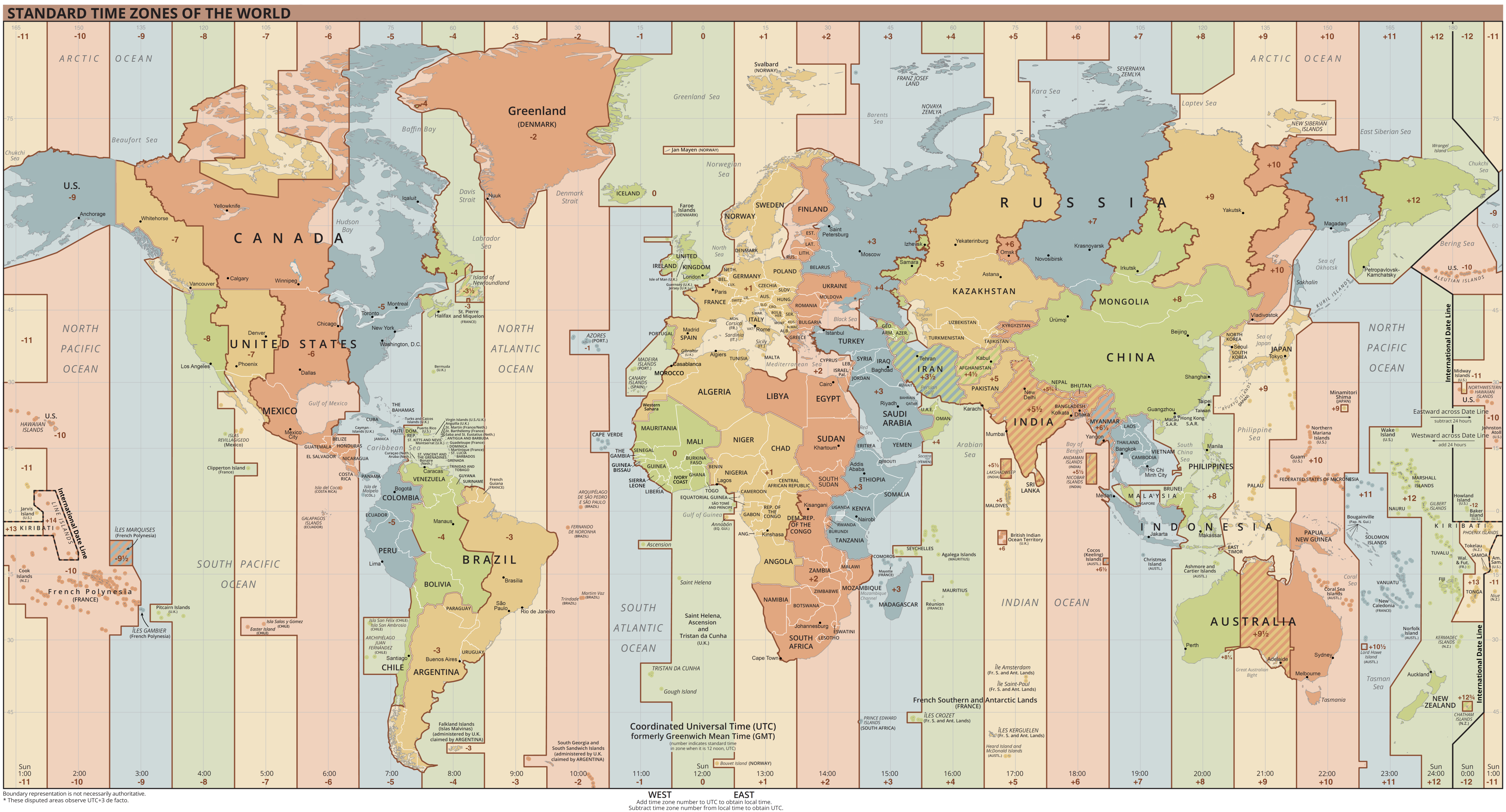
Standard time zones of the world. The number at the bottom of each zone specifies the number of hours to add to UTC to convert it to the local time.

As international commerce increased, the need for an international standard of time measurement emerged. Several authors proposed a "universal" or "cosmic" time (see Time zone § Worldwide time zones). The development of Universal Time began at the International Meridian Conference. At the end of this conference, on 22 October 1884, (Note: Voting took place on 13 October.) the recommended base reference for world time, the "universal day", was announced to be the local mean solar time at the Royal Observatory in Greenwich, counted from 0 hours at Greenwich mean midnight. This agreed with the civil Greenwich Mean Time used on the island of Great Britain since 1847. In contrast, astronomical GMT began at mean noon, i.e. astronomical day X began at noon of civil day X. The purpose of this was to keep one night's observations under one date. The civil system was adopted as of 0 hours (civil) 1 January 1925. Nautical GMT began 24 hours before astronomical GMT, at least until 1805 in the Royal Navy, but persisted much later elsewhere because it was mentioned at the 1884 conference. Greenwich was chosen because by 1884 two-thirds of all nautical charts and maps already used it as their prime meridian.

During the period between 1848 and 1972, all of the major countries adopted time zones based on the Greenwich meridian.

In 1928, the term Universal Time (UT) was introduced by the International Astronomical Union to refer to GMT, with the day starting at midnight. The term was recommended as a more precise term than Greenwich Mean Time, because GMT could refer to either an astronomical day starting at noon or a civil day starting at midnight. As the general public had always begun the day at midnight, the timescale continued to be presented to them as Greenwich Mean Time.

When introduced, broadcast time signals were based on UT, and hence on the rotation of the Earth. In 1955 the BIH adopted a proposal by William Markowitz, effective 1 January 1956, dividing UT into UT0 (UT as formerly computed), UT1 (UT0 corrected for polar motion) and UT2 (UT0 corrected for polar motion and seasonal variation). UT1 was the version sufficient for "many astronomical and geodetic applications", while UT2 was to be broadcast over radio to the public.

UT0 and UT2 soon became irrelevant due to the introduction of Coordinated Universal Time (UTC). Starting in 1956, WWV broadcast an atomic clock signal stepped by 20 ms increments to bring it into agreement with UT1. The error from UT1 of up to 20 ms is on the same order of magnitude as the differences between UT0, UT1, and UT2. By 1960, the U.S. Naval Observatory, the Royal Greenwich Observatory, and the UK National Physical Laboratory had developed UTC, with a similar stepping approach. The 1960 URSI meeting recommended that all time services should follow the lead of the UK and US and broadcast coordinated time using a frequency offset from cesium aimed to match the predicted progression of UT2 with occasional steps as needed. Starting 1 January 1972, UTC was defined to follow UT1 within 0.9 seconds rather than UT2, marking the decline of UT2.

Modern civil time generally follows UTC. In some countries, the term Greenwich Mean Time persists in common usage to this day in reference to UT1, in civil timekeeping as well as in astronomical almanacs and other references. From 1972 until 2026, the magnitude of the difference between UTC and UT1 was maintained below 0.9 second through the use of leap seconds, but as of 2027 leap seconds are abolished and the difference will be allowed to grow to as much as 3600 seconds; a difference of this magnitude may not be reached for centuries.

=== Adoption in various countries ===
The table shows the dates of adoption of time zones based on the Greenwich meridian, including half-hour zones.

Year	Countries
1847	Great Britain
1868	New Zealand
1880	Ireland (entire island)
1883	Canada, United States (Note: legal in 1918 (Standard Time Act))
1884	Serbia
1888	Japan
1892	Belgium, the Netherlands, (Note: Legal time reverted to Amsterdam time 1909; to Central European Time 1940.) S. Africa (Note: except Natal)
1893	Italy, Germany, Austria-Hungary (railways)
1894	Bulgaria, Denmark, Norway, Switzerland, Romania, Turkey (railways)
1895	Australia, Natal
1896	Formosa (Taiwan)
1899	Puerto Rico, Philippines
1900	Sweden, Egypt, Alaska
1901	Spain
1902	Mozambique, Rhodesia
1903	Ts'intao, Tientsin
1904	China Coast, Korea, Manchuria, N. Borneo
1905	Chile
1906	India (except Calcutta), Ceylon (Sri Lanka), Seychelles
1907	Mauritius, Chagos
1908	Faroe Is., Iceland
1911	France, Algeria, Tunis, many French overseas possessions, British West Indies
1912	Portugal and overseas possessions, other French possessions, Samoa, Hawaii, Midway and Guam, Timor, Bismarck Arch., Jamaica, Bahamas Is.
1913	British Honduras, Dahomey
1914	Albania, Brazil, Colombia
1916	Greece, Poland, Turkey

Year	Countries
1917	Iraq, Palestine
1918	Guatemala, Panama, Gambia, Gold Coast
1919	Latvia, Nigeria
1920	Argentina, Uruguay, Burma, Siam
1921	Finland, Estonia, Costa Rica
1922	Mexico
1924	Java, USSR
1925	Cuba
1928	China Inland
1930	Bermuda
1931	Paraguay
1932	Barbados, Bolivia, Dutch East Indies
1934	Nicaragua, E. Niger
By 1936	Labrador, Norfolk I.
By 1937	Cayman Is., Curaçao, Ecuador, Newfoundland
By 1939	Fernando Po, Persia
By 1940	Lord Howe I.
1940	The Netherlands
By 1948	Aden, Ascension I., Bahrain, British Somaliland, Calcutta, Dutch Guiana, Kenya, Federated Malay States, Oman, Straits Settlements, St. Helena, Uganda, Zanzibar
By 1953	Rarotonga, South Georgia
By 1954	Cook Is.
By 1959	Maldive I. Republic
By 1961	Friendly Is., Tonga Is.
By 1962	Saudi Arabia
By 1964	Niue Is.
1972	Liberia

Apart from Nepal Standard Time (UTC+05:45), the Chatham Standard Time Zone (UTC+12:45) used in New Zealand's Chatham Islands and the officially unsanctioned Central Western Time Zone (UTC+8:45) used in Eucla, Western Australia and surrounding areas, all time zones in use are defined by an offset from UTC that is a multiple of half an hour, and in most cases a multiple of an hour.

== Measurement ==
Historically, Universal Time was computed from observing the position of the Sun in the sky. But astronomers found that it was more accurate to measure the rotation of the Earth by observing stars as they crossed the meridian each day. Nowadays, UT in relation to International Atomic Time (TAI) is determined by very-long-baseline interferometry (VLBI) observations of the positions of distant celestial objects (stars and quasars), a method which can determine UT1 to within 15 microseconds or better.

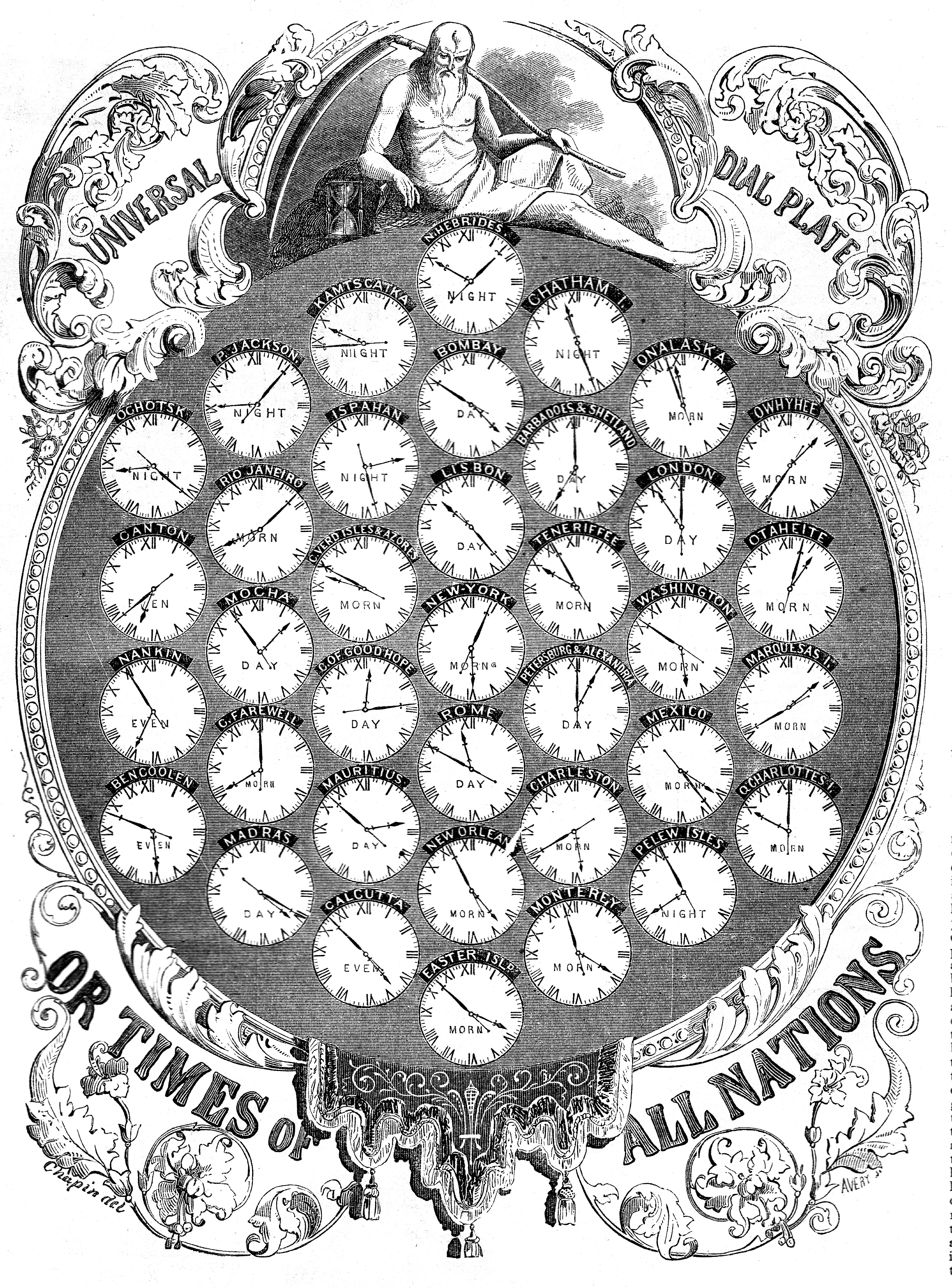
An 1853 "Universal Dial Plate" showing the relative times of "all nations" before the adoption of universal time

The rotation of the Earth and UT are monitored by the International Earth Rotation and Reference Systems Service (IERS). The International Astronomical Union also is involved in setting standards, but the final arbiter of broadcast standards is the International Telecommunication Union, or ITU.

The rotation of the Earth is somewhat irregular and also is very gradually slowing due to tidal acceleration. Furthermore, the length of the second was determined from observations of the Moon between 1750 and 1890. All of these factors cause the modern mean solar day, on the average, to be slightly longer than the nominal 86,400 SI seconds, the traditional number of seconds per day. (Note: 24 hours of 60 minutes of 60 seconds) As UT is thus slightly irregular in its rate, astronomers introduced Ephemeris Time, which has since been replaced by Terrestrial Time (TT). Because Universal Time is determined by the Earth's rotation, which drifts away from more precise atomic-frequency standards, an adjustment (called a leap second) to this atomic time is needed since (as of 2019) 'broadcast time' remains broadly synchronised with solar time. (Note: Continuation of this principle is under active debate in standards bodies. See Leap second#Future of leap seconds) Thus, the civil broadcast standard for time and frequency usually follows International Atomic Time closely, but occasionally step (or "leap") in order to prevent them from drifting too far from mean solar time.

Barycentric Dynamical Time (TDB), a form of atomic time, is now used in the construction of the ephemerides of the planets and other Solar System objects, for two main reasons. First, these ephemerides are tied to optical and radar observations of planetary motion, and the TDB time scale is fitted so that Newton's laws of motion, with corrections for general relativity, are followed. Next, the time scales based on Earth's rotation are not uniform and therefore, are not suitable for predicting the motion of bodies in the Solar System.

== Versions ==
UT1 is the principal form of Universal Time. However, there are also several other infrequently used time standards that are referred to as Universal Time, which agree within 0.03 seconds of UT1:

- UT0 is Universal Time determined at an observatory by observing the diurnal motion of stars or extragalactic radio sources, and also from ranging observations of the Moon and artificial Earth satellites. The location of the observatory is considered to have fixed coordinates in a terrestrial reference frame (such as the International Terrestrial Reference Frame) but the position of the rotational axis of the Earth wanders over the surface of the Earth; this is known as polar motion. UT0 does not contain any correction for polar motion, while UT1 does include them. The difference between UT0 and UT1 is on the order of a few tens of milliseconds. The designation UT0 is no longer in common use.
- UT1R is a smoothed version of UT1, filtering out periodic variations due to tides. It includes 62 smoothing terms, with periods ranging from 5.6 days to 18.6 years. UT1R is still in use in the technical literature but rarely used elsewhere.
- UT2 is a smoothed version of UT1, filtering out periodic seasonal variations. It is mostly of historic interest and rarely used anymore. It is defined by
  $UT2 = UT1 + 0.022\cdot\sin(2\pi t) - 0.012\cdot\cos(2\pi t) - 0.006\cdot\sin(4\pi t) + 0.007\cdot\cos(4\pi t)\;\mbox{seconds}$
  where t is the time as a fraction of the Besselian year.

== See also ==
- Airy mean time on Mars
- Earth orientation parameters
- List of international common standards
- Unix time
