= Fuzzball router =

First routers on the internet

Fuzzball routers were the first modern routers on the Internet. They were DEC PDP-11 computers (usually LSI-11 personal workstations) loaded with the Fuzzball software written by David L. Mills (of the University of Delaware). The name "Fuzzball" was the colloquialism for Mills's routing software. The software evolved from the Distributed Computer Network (DCN) that started at the University of Maryland in 1973. It acquired the nickname sometime after it was rewritten in 1977.

Six Fuzzball routers provided the routing backbone of the first 56 kbit/s NSFNET, allowing the testing of many of the Internet's first protocols. It allowed the development of the first TCP/IP routing protocols, and the Network Time Protocol. They were the first routers to implement key refinements to TCP/IP such as variable-length subnet masks.

== See also ==
- Interface Message Processor
