= Felicitas Arias =

Argentine astronomer (born 1952)

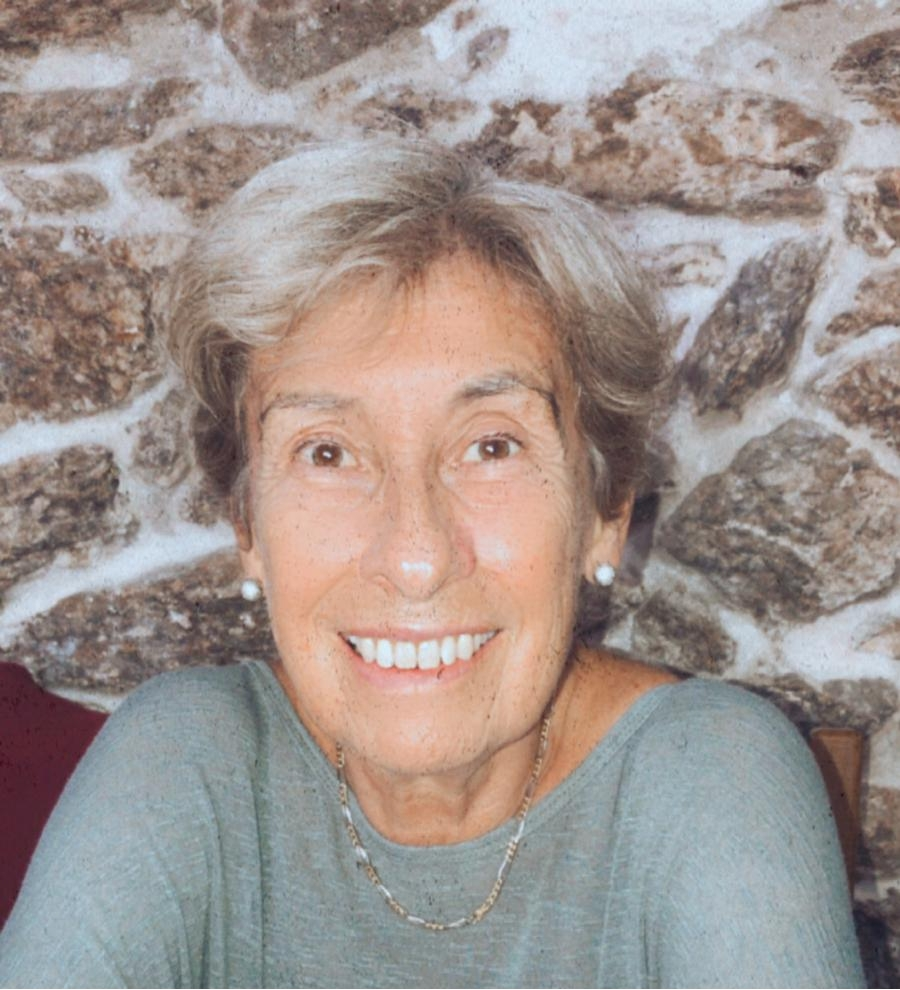
- Felicitas Arias in 2024
- Born: 1952 (age 74); La Plata, Argentina
- Education: University of La Plata; Paris Observatory
- Known for: Studies on International Celestial Reference System
- Scientific career
- Fields: Astronomy and geodesy
- Workplaces: International Bureau of Weights and Measures

Elisa Felicitas Arias (born 1952) is an Argentine astronomer. She worked as Head of Time, Frequency and Gravimetry at the International Bureau of Weights and Measures (BIPM) between 1999 and 2017, and is recognised for her contributions to the definition and implementation of the International Celestial Reference System.

== Early life and education ==
Arias was born in 1952 in La Plata, Argentina. She was the only child of a pharmacist and a police commissioner. Her father was of Italian descent, and her mother was of Spanish descent.

She studied primary education at the University of La Plata school. She inherited her interest in astronomy from an uncle, and ended up graduating in astronomy from the University of La Plata in 1976. She also taught at that University.

In 1986, Arias moved to France for temporary research work and in 1990 she obtained her PhD in asymmetry, celestial mechanics and geodesy at the Paris Observatory.

== Career ==
In 1991, Arias was appointed director of the Buenos Aires Naval Observatory, responsible for the official time in Argentina. She began there as scientific director until her position absorbed the military directorate. During that time, she also worked on defining and implementing the International Celestial Reference System at the International Earth Rotation and Reference Systems Service (IERS), which served to study the Earth's rotation and determine when to add the leap second.

After the position of head of the Time, Frequency and Gravimetry section of the International Bureau of Weights and Measures (BIPM) became vacant, Arias applied for the job and won the competition in 1999, moving with her family to Paris. Her job consisted of coordinating the international time reference of the 80 atomic clocks around the world and using that data to perform calculations and computations to provide the UTC. She retired in 2017.

Arias has expressed the need to eliminate the leap second and not coordinate time with the Earth's rotation, as it is "imperceptible" to civilian life and is causing "inconveniences for certain applications that require uniform time". In a press release, she stated that the drift of about one minute every 60–90 years could be compared to the 16-minute annual variation between true solar time and mean solar time, the one hour offset by use of daylight time, and the several-hours offset in certain geographically extra-large time zones.

She wrote the prologue to the book Astronomy in Lilliput: Introductory Workshops on Space Sciences and collaborated with other professionals from the University of La Plata in preparing topics for the book Objective Universe.

== Personal life ==
Arias married in 1995 and had her only daughter two years later.

== Selected publications ==
- Arias, Elisa Felicitas. The Metrology of Time. Philosophical Transactions: Mathematical, Physical and Engineering Sciences, vol. 363, no. 1834, (2005), pp. 2289–305.
- Arias, F. One more second. Nature Phys 12, 1178 (2016).
- Arias, Elisa Felicitas, et al., editors. The Science of Time 2016 : Time in Astronomy & Society, Past, Present and Future. Springer eBooks, Springer International Publishing : Imprint : Springer, (2017)
- Arias, Felicitas. Atomic Time Scales and Their Applications in Astronomy. The Science of Time 2016, (2017), pp. 103–4
- Arias, Elisa Felicitas. New Technologies and the Future of Timekeeping. The Science of Time 2016, (2017), pp. 379–89.
- Arias, Elisa Felicitas, and Gérard Petit. The Hyperfine Transition for the Definition of the Second. Annalen Der Physik, vol. 531, no. 5, (2019)
- Arias, Elisa Felicitas. PREFACE: Global Navigation Satellite Systems: Recent Scientific Advances. Advances in Space Research, vol. 74, no. 6, (2024), p. 2531
