= Civil time =

Statutory local time in some given area

In modern usage, civil time refers to statutory time as designated by civilian authorities. Modern civil time is generally national standard time in a time zone at a fixed offset from Coordinated Universal Time (UTC), possibly adjusted by daylight saving time during part of the year. UTC is calculated by reference to atomic clocks and was adopted in 1972. Older systems use telescope observations.

In traditional astronomical usage, civil time was mean solar time reckoned from midnight. Before 1925, the astronomical time 00:00:00 meant noon, twelve hours after the civil time 00:00:00 which meant midnight. HM Nautical Almanac Office in the United Kingdom used Greenwich Mean Time (GMT) for both conventions, leading to ambiguity, whereas the Nautical Almanac Office at the United States Naval Observatory used GMT for the pre-1925 convention and Greenwich Civil Time (GCT) for the post-1924 convention until 1952. In 1928, the International Astronomical Union introduced the term Universal Time for GMT beginning at midnight.

In modern usage, GMT is no longer a formal standard reference time: it is now a name for the time zone UTC+00:00. Universal Time is now determined by reference to distant celestial objects: UTC is derived from International Atomic Time (TAI), and is adjusted by leap seconds to compensate for variations in the rotational velocity of the Earth. Civil Times around the world are all defined by reference to UTC. In many jurisdictions, legislation has not been updated and still refers to GMT; this is taken to mean UTC+0.

== History ==
The division of the day into times of day has existed since the beginning of the calendar.

=== Twelve hours: Babylonian and Roman division of the day ===
People in Antiquity divided the day into twelve hours, but these were reckoned from sunrise rather than midnight. Babylonian hours were of equal length, while Roman temporal hours varied depending on the season.

The Horae, literally "the hours," were the original Greek goddesses who oversaw regulated life. They were the patron goddesses of the various times of day. In Greek tradition, the twelve hours were counted from just before sunrise to just after sunset.

Roman daytimes were called hora (hours), with the morning hour as hora prima. The night was divided into four sections called vigilia (night watch), two before midnight and two after. The Romans originally counted the morning hours backwards: "3 a. m." or "3 hours ante meridiem" meant "three hours before noon", in contrast to the modern meaning "three hours after midnight".

This ancient division has survived in the Liturgy of the Hours: Prime, Terce, Sext, and Nones are named after the first, third, sixth and ninth hours of the day. The Matins, the nocturnal prayer is, according to the Rule of Saint Benedict, to be prayed at the "eighth hour of the night", which corresponds to about 2 am.

The Spanish siesta derives its name from the Latin hora sexta for the sixth hour (noon).

=== Middle East ===
In Semitic language cultures, the day traditionally begins at nightfall. This is still important today for the beginning of Shabbat and Islamic holidays.

A division of days has survived from Persian, following the Babylonian beginning of the day: The rōsgār (times of day) are hāwan (morning), uapihwin (afternoon), usērin (evening), ēbsrūsrim (sunset to midnight), and ushahin (midnight to dawn). The last two are collectively called shab (night).

=== Middle Ages and early modern times ===
The modern division of the day into twenty-four hours of equal length (Italian hours) first appeared in the 14th century with the invention of the mechanical wheel clock and its widespread use in turret clocks.

With the onset of industrialization, working hours became tied to the clock rather than to daylight.

== See also ==
- Local time – Time measured in a specific place
- Solar time – Calculation of elapsed time by the apparent position of the sun
- Civil calendar – Calendar used within a country for civil, official, or administrative purposes
- Category:Time by country
- Category:Time zones
