= David L. Mills =

American computer scientist (1938–2024)

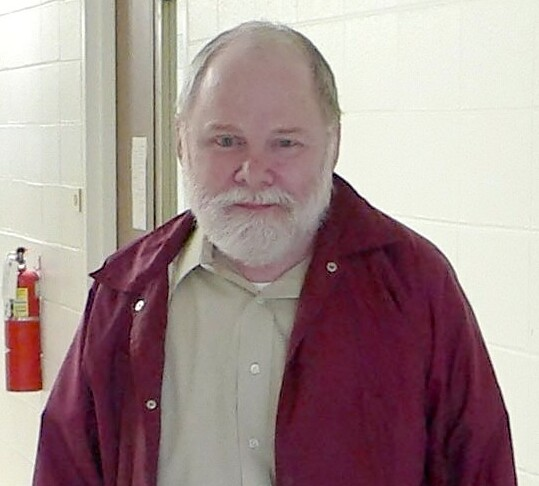
- Mills in 2005
- Born: David Lennox Mills; June 3, 1938; Oakland, California, U.S.
- Died: January 17, 2024 (aged 85); Newark, Delaware, U.S.
- Education: University of Michigan (BS, MS, PhD)
- Known for: Network Time Protocol; Exterior Gateway Protocol
- Awards: IEEE Internet Award (2013)
- Scientific career
- Fields: Computer science
- Workplaces: University of Delaware
- Website: www.eecis.udel.edu/~mills

David Lennox Mills (June 3, 1938 – January 17, 2024) was an American computer engineer and professor emeritus at the University of Delaware. He was an Internet pioneer who led the Gateway Algorithms and Data Structures (GADS) Task Force. He was known as the internet's "Father Time" for designing the Network Time Protocol, which is intended to synchronize all participating computers across different computer systems and networks to within a few milliseconds of Coordinated Universal Time.

== Early life and education ==
David Lennox Mills was born in Oakland, California on June 3, 1938. His mother, Adele (née Dougherty), was a pianist, and his father, Alfred, was an engineer. He had glaucoma since birth, but a surgeon saved some of the vision in his left eye when he was a child. He attended a school in San Mateo, California, for the visually impaired.

Mills earned his PhD in Computer and Communication Sciences from the University of Michigan in 1971. While at Michigan, he worked on the ARPA-sponsored Conversational Use of Computers (CONCOMP) project and developed DEC PDP-8-based hardware and software to allow terminals to be connected over phone lines to an IBM 360 mainframe.

== Career ==
In 1977, Mills began working at COMSAT on synchronizing the clocks of computers connected to ARPANET, inventing the Network Time Protocol (NTP). NTP is intended to synchronize all participating computers to within a few milliseconds of Coordinated Universal Time (UTC). He told The New Yorker in 2022 that he enjoyed working on synchronized time because no one else was working on it, giving him his own "little fief". In the mid-2000s, Mills turned over full control of the NTP reference implementation to Harlan Stenn.

Mills was a contributor to the standards and software that came to be the Internet. He was the chairman of the Gateway Algorithms and Data Structures Task Force (GADS) and the first chairman of the Internet Architecture Task Force. He invented the DEC LSI-11-based Fuzzball router that was used for the 56 kbit/s NSFNET (1985), and inspired the author of ping. He authored 28 RFCs, including two Internet Standards.

In 1999, he was inducted as a fellow of the Association for Computing Machinery, and in 2002, he was inducted as a fellow of the Institute of Electrical and Electronics Engineers (IEEE) for contributions to network protocols and network timekeeping in the development of the Internet. In 2008, Mills was elected a member of the National Academy of Engineering (NAE) for contributions to Internet timekeeping and the development of the Network Time Protocol. In 2013, he received the IEEE Internet Award "for significant leadership and sustained contributions in the research, development, standardization, and deployment of quality time synchronization capabilities for the Internet."

Mills was a professor emeritus at the University of Delaware, where he was a full professor from 1986 to 2008. He subsequently held an adjunct appointment at Delaware so that he could continue to teach.

== Personal life ==
Mills married Beverly Csizmadia in 1965.

Mills was an amateur radio operator, with callsign W3HCF.

His vision began worsening around 2012, and by 2022 he was fully blind. Mills died in Newark, Delaware, on January 17, 2024, at age 85. Mills' wife, Beverly Jean Csizmadia Mills, died September 30, 2024, in Newark, Delaware.
