= New Earth Time =

Naming system for time on Earth

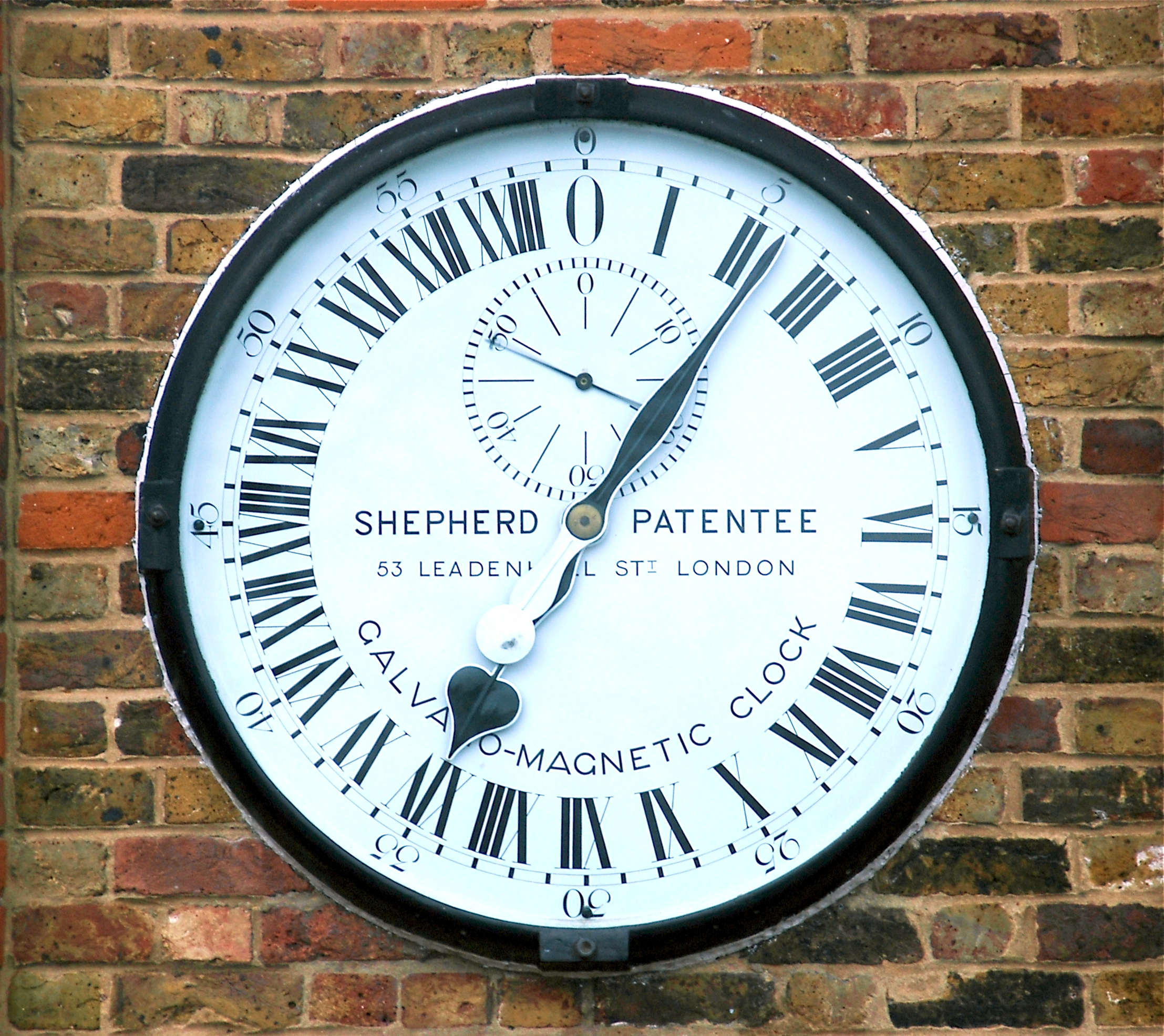
The Greenwich 24-hour analog clock at 14:06:49 UTC. The hour hand is at an angle of 211°42′15″ from vertical, making the time 211°42′15″ in NET.

An example New Earth Time analog clock

New Earth Time (or NET), also called degree time, is an alternative naming system for measuring the time of day proposed in 1999. In NET the day is split into 360 NET degrees, each NET degree is split into 60 NET minutes and each NET minute is split into 60 NET seconds. One NET degree is therefore equivalent to four standard minutes, and one standard hour is equivalent to 15 NET degrees.

NET is equivalent to the UTC read from a 24-hour analog clock as the clockwise angle past midnight of the hour hand. For example, noon is 180°0′0″ NET and at that time the hour hand is pointing straight down forming a 180° angle when measured from the top, at midnight. A full circle is 360 degrees and one NET day.

== History ==
New Earth Time was invented on 15 September 1999 by Mark Laugesen from Auckland, New Zealand. The rights to the name New Earth Time (or NET) and slogan "360 degrees of time" are novel and owned by degree NET Ltd. Similar ideas for unifying time measurement across the globe include Swatch Internet Time, another rebranding of UTC+1.

== See also ==
- 24-hour analog dial
- Decimal time
- Rebranding
- Swatch Internet Time
- UTC
