= Internet time =

Internet time may refer to:

- Network Time Protocol (NTP), a method for synchronising device clocks via Internet
- Swatch Internet Time, a unit of decimal time
- Time server, an Internet server that distributes time information to clients
- IETF RFC 3339 defines a profile of ISO8601 (on the format YYYY-MM-DD HH:mm:ss) for use in internet protocols and standards
