= Ventôse =

6th month in the French Republican calendar

Ventôse (French pronunciation: [vɑ̃toz]; also Ventose) was the sixth month in the French Republican Calendar. The month was named after the Latin word ventosus meaning 'windy'.

Ventôse was the third month of the winter quarter (mois d'hiver). It started between 19 and 21 February. It ended between 20 and 21 March. It follows the second month, Pluviôse, and precedes the fourth month, Germinal.

New names for the calendar were suggested by Fabre d'Églantine on 24 October 1793 and on 24 November the National Convention accepted the names with minor changes. It was decided to omit the circumflex (accent circonflexe) in the names of the winter months, so the month was named Ventose instead of Ventôse. Historiography prefers the spelling Ventôse.

Year: 3
Month: Ventôse
Year: III

Day of the 10-day
week (décade)
Primidi
Duodi
Tridi
Quartidi
Quintidi
Sextidi
Septidi
Octidi
Nonidi
Décadi

décade 16
1	Thursday; 19 February 1795
2	Friday; 20 February 1795
3	Saturday; 21 February 1795
4	Sunday; 22 February 1795
5	Monday; 23 February 1795
6	Tuesday; 24 February 1795
7	Wednesday; 25 February 1795
8	Thursday; 26 February 1795
9	Friday; 27 February 1795
10	Saturday; 28 February 1795

décade 17
11	Sunday; 1 March 1795
12	Monday; 2 March 1795
13	Tuesday; 3 March 1795
14	Wednesday; 4 March 1795
15	Thursday; 5 March 1795
16	Friday; 6 March 1795
17	Saturday; 7 March 1795
18	Sunday; 8 March 1795
19	Monday; 9 March 1795
20	Tuesday; 10 March 1795

décade 18
21	Wednesday; 11 March 1795
22	Thursday; 12 March 1795
23	Friday; 13 March 1795
24	Saturday; 14 March 1795
25	Sunday; 15 March 1795
26	Monday; 16 March 1795
27	Tuesday; 17 March 1795
28	Wednesday; 18 March 1795
29	Thursday; 19 March 1795
30	Friday; 20 March 1795

Decimal time – 10 h/day
Paris
7h17m37s

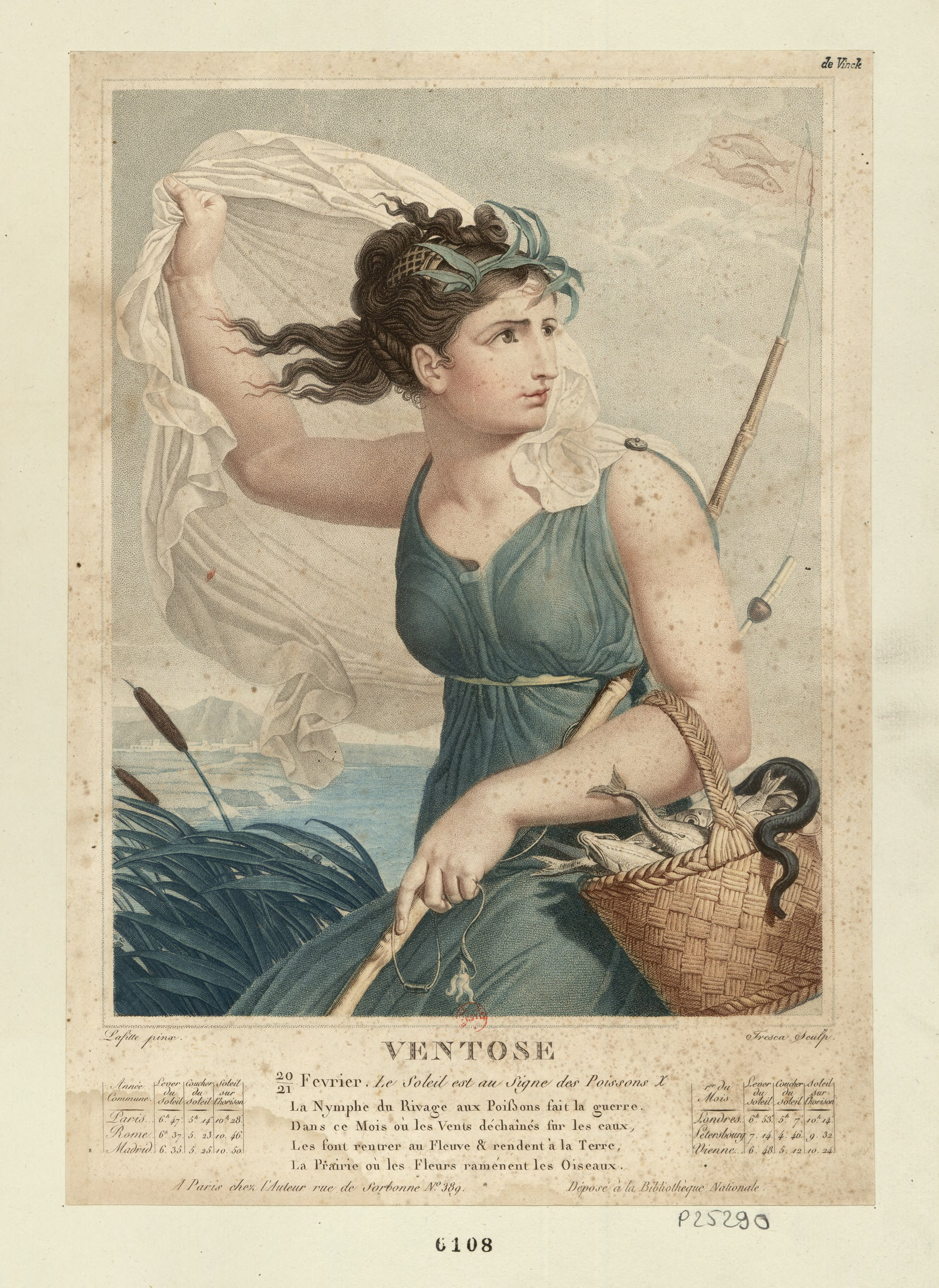
Ventôse

17:03:40
Time of day - 24 h/day
Greenwich

Conversion between Republican and Gregorian calendar for the years I - XIV

Year: 1
Month: Ventôse
Year: I

Day of the 10-day
week (décade)
Primidi
Duodi
Tridi
Quartidi
Quintidi
Sextidi
Septidi
Octidi
Nonidi
Décadi

décade 16
1	Tuesday; 19 February 1793
2	Wednesday; 20 February 1793
3	Thursday; 21 February 1793
4	Friday; 22 February 1793
5	Saturday; 23 February 1793
6	Sunday; 24 February 1793
7	Monday; 25 February 1793
8	Tuesday; 26 February 1793
9	Wednesday; 27 February 1793
10	Thursday; 28 February 1793

décade 17
11	Friday; 1 March 1793
12	Saturday; 2 March 1793
13	Sunday; 3 March 1793
14	Monday; 4 March 1793
15	Tuesday; 5 March 1793
16	Wednesday; 6 March 1793
17	Thursday; 7 March 1793
18	Friday; 8 March 1793
19	Saturday; 9 March 1793
20	Sunday; 10 March 1793

décade 18
21	Monday; 11 March 1793
22	Tuesday; 12 March 1793
23	Wednesday; 13 March 1793
24	Thursday; 14 March 1793
25	Friday; 15 March 1793
26	Saturday; 16 March 1793
27	Sunday; 17 March 1793
28	Monday; 18 March 1793
29	Tuesday; 19 March 1793
30	Wednesday; 20 March 1793

Decimal time – 10 h/day
Paris
7:10:87

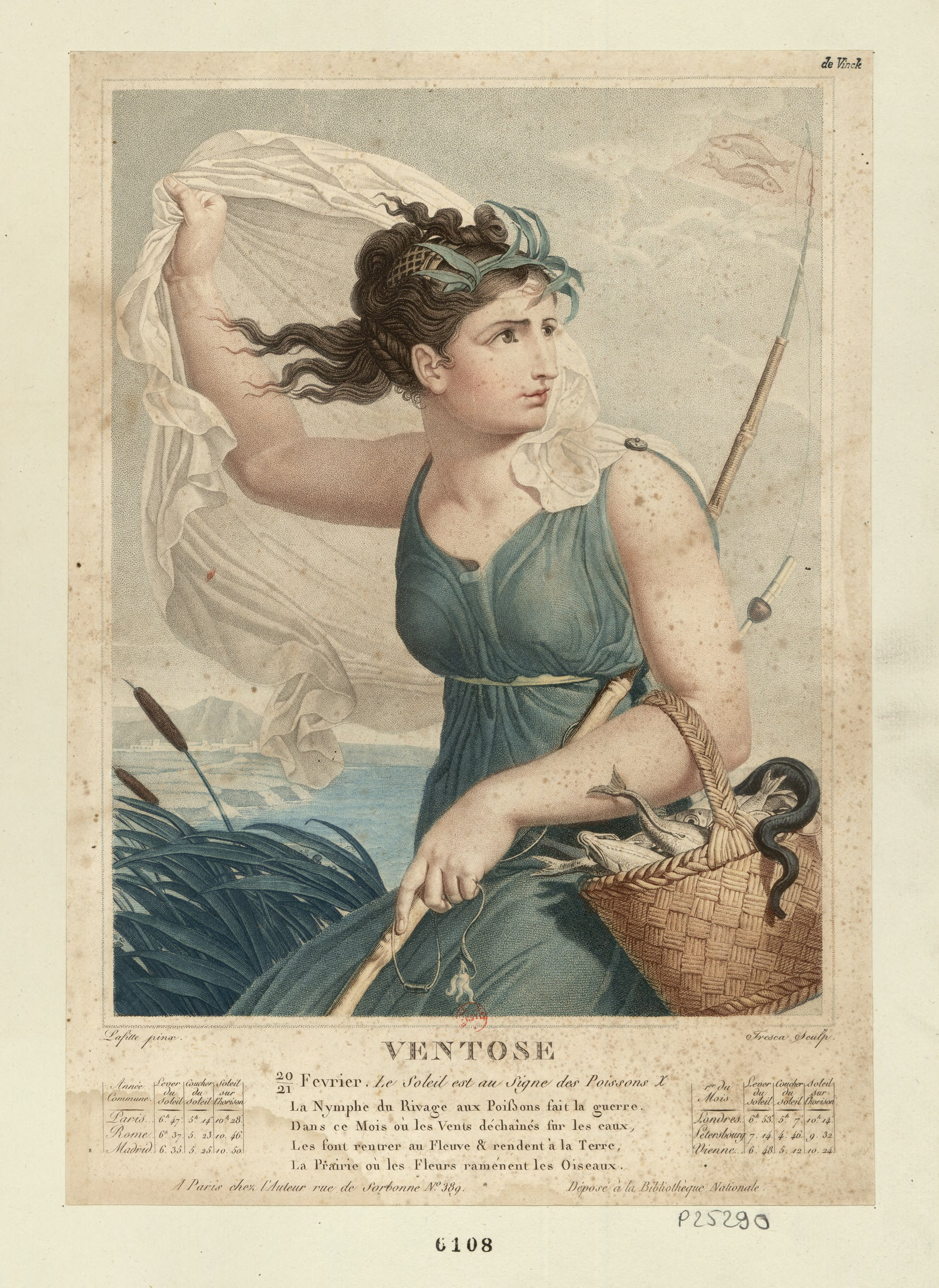
Ventôse

17:03:40
Time of day - 24 h/day
Greenwich

Year: 2
Month: Ventôse
Year: II

Day of the 10-day
week (décade)
Primidi
Duodi
Tridi
Quartidi
Quintidi
Sextidi
Septidi
Octidi
Nonidi
Décadi

décade 16
1	Wednesday; 19 February 1794
2	Thursday; 20 February 1794
3	Friday; 21 February 1794
4	Saturday; 22 February 1794
5	Sunday; 23 February 1794
6	Monday; 24 February 1794
7	Tuesday; 25 February 1794
8	Wednesday; 26 February 1794
9	Thursday; 27 February 1794
10	Friday; 28 February 1794

décade 17
11	Saturday; 1 March 1794
12	Sunday; 2 March 1794
13	Monday; 3 March 1794
14	Tuesday; 4 March 1794
15	Wednesday; 5 March 1794
16	Thursday; 6 March 1794
17	Friday; 7 March 1794
18	Saturday; 8 March 1794
19	Sunday; 9 March 1794
20	Monday; 10 March 1794

décade 18
21	Tuesday; 11 March 1794
22	Wednesday; 12 March 1794
23	Thursday; 13 March 1794
24	Friday; 14 March 1794
25	Saturday; 15 March 1794
26	Sunday; 16 March 1794
27	Monday; 17 March 1794
28	Tuesday; 18 March 1794
29	Wednesday; 19 March 1794
30	Thursday; 20 March 1794

Decimal time – 10 h/day
Paris
7:10:87

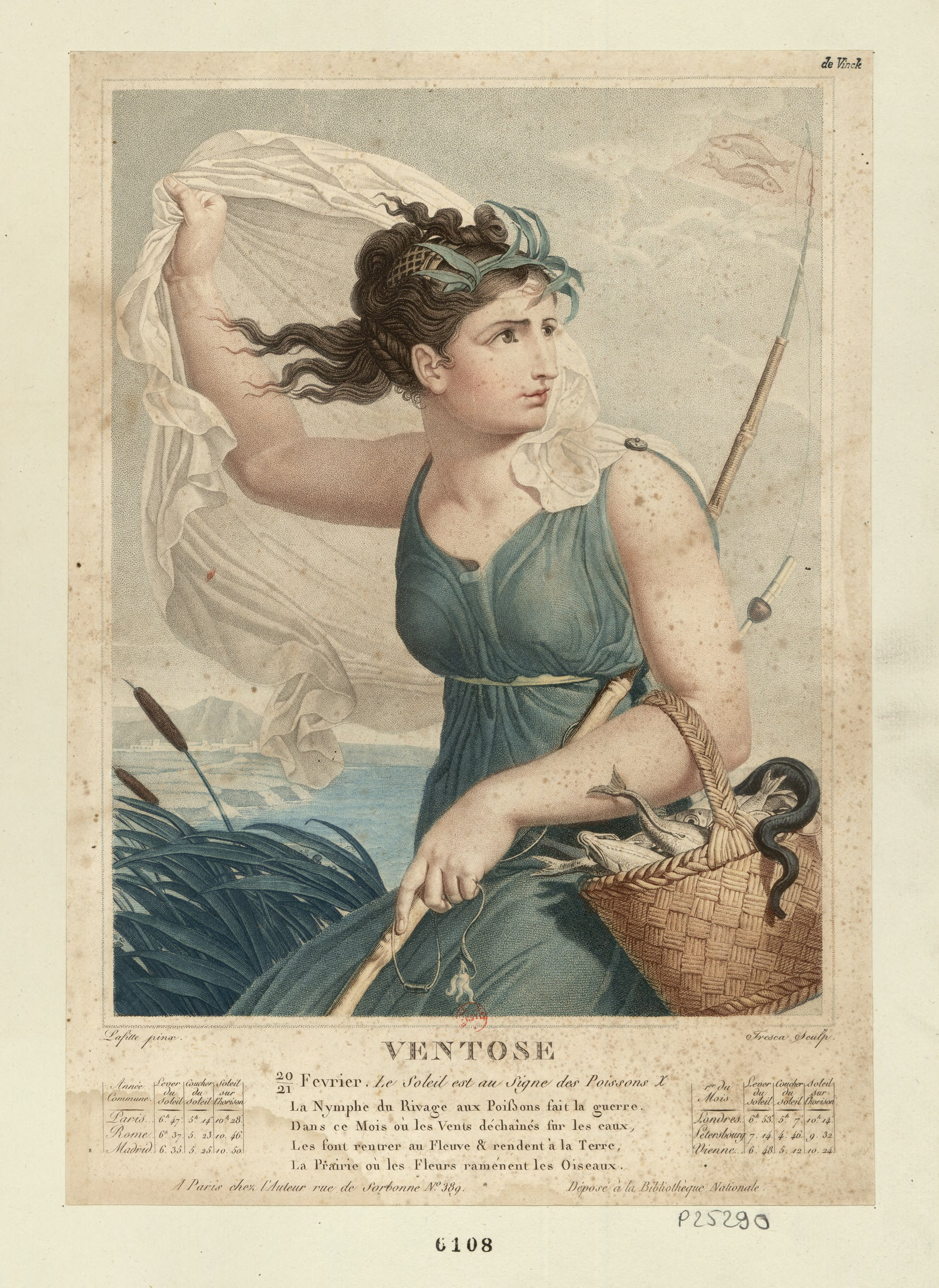
Ventôse

17:03:40
Time of day - 24 h/day
Greenwich

Year: 3
Month: Ventôse
Year: III

Day of the 10-day
week (décade)
Primidi
Duodi
Tridi
Quartidi
Quintidi
Sextidi
Septidi
Octidi
Nonidi
Décadi

décade 16
1	Thursday; 19 February 1795
2	Friday; 20 February 1795
3	Saturday; 21 February 1795
4	Sunday; 22 February 1795
5	Monday; 23 February 1795
6	Tuesday; 24 February 1795
7	Wednesday; 25 February 1795
8	Thursday; 26 February 1795
9	Friday; 27 February 1795
10	Saturday; 28 February 1795

décade 17
11	Sunday; 1 March 1795
12	Monday; 2 March 1795
13	Tuesday; 3 March 1795
14	Wednesday; 4 March 1795
15	Thursday; 5 March 1795
16	Friday; 6 March 1795
17	Saturday; 7 March 1795
18	Sunday; 8 March 1795
19	Monday; 9 March 1795
20	Tuesday; 10 March 1795

décade 18
21	Wednesday; 11 March 1795
22	Thursday; 12 March 1795
23	Friday; 13 March 1795
24	Saturday; 14 March 1795
25	Sunday; 15 March 1795
26	Monday; 16 March 1795
27	Tuesday; 17 March 1795
28	Wednesday; 18 March 1795
29	Thursday; 19 March 1795
30	Friday; 20 March 1795

Decimal time – 10 h/day
Paris
7:10:87

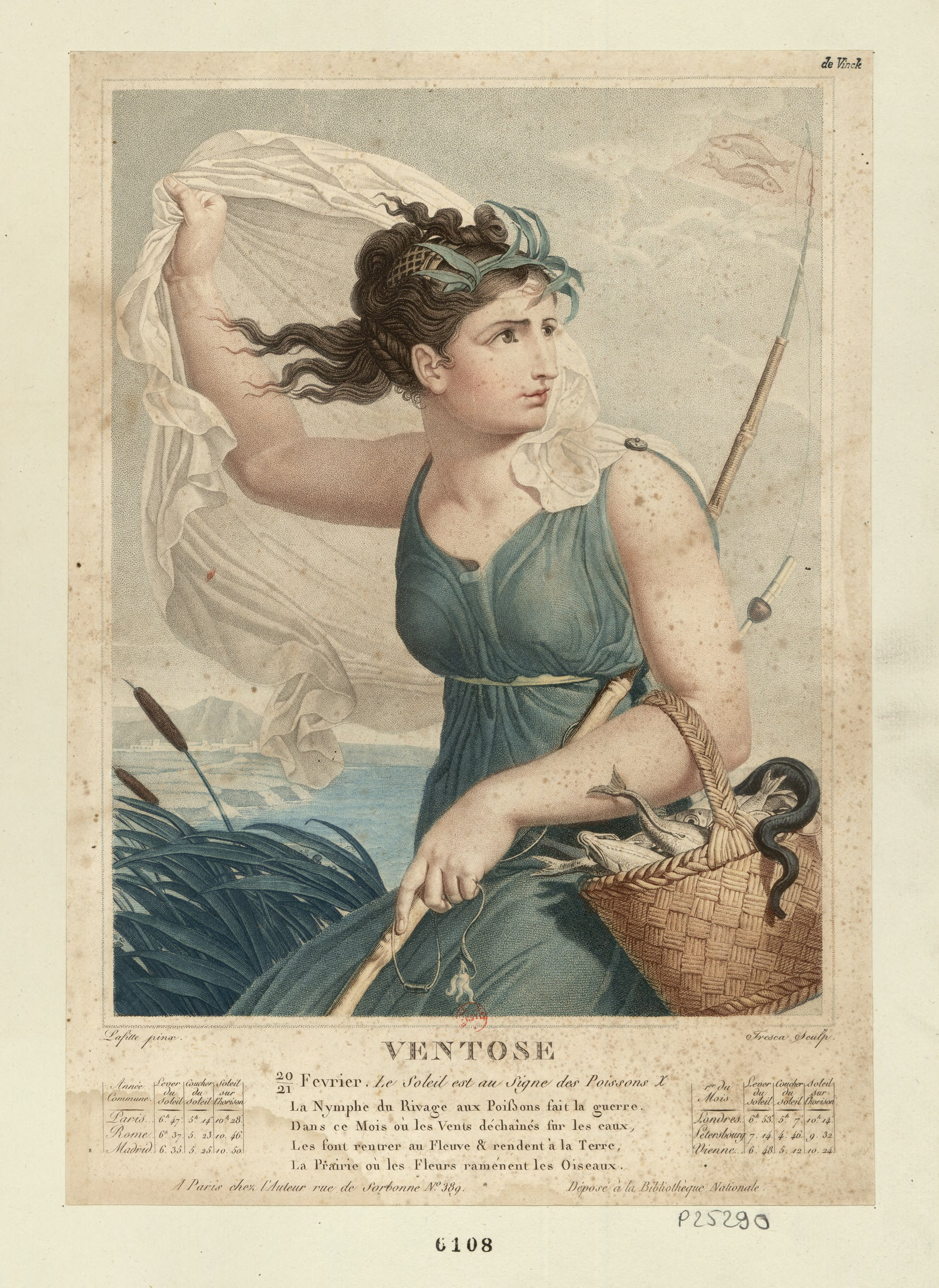
Ventôse

17:03:40
Time of day - 24 h/day
Greenwich

Year: 4
Month: Ventôse
Year: IV

Day of the 10-day
week (décade)
Primidi
Duodi
Tridi
Quartidi
Quintidi
Sextidi
Septidi
Octidi
Nonidi
Décadi

décade 16
1	Saturday; 20 February 1796
2	Sunday; 21 February 1796
3	Monday; 22 February 1796
4	Tuesday; 23 February 1796
5	Wednesday; 24 February 1796
6	Thursday; 25 February 1796
7	Friday; 26 February 1796
8	Saturday; 27 February 1796
9	Sunday; 28 February 1796
10	Monday; 29 February 1796

décade 17
11	Tuesday; 1 March 1796
12	Wednesday; 2 March 1796
13	Thursday; 3 March 1796
14	Friday; 4 March 1796
15	Saturday; 5 March 1796
16	Sunday; 6 March 1796
17	Monday; 7 March 1796
18	Tuesday; 8 March 1796
19	Wednesday; 9 March 1796
20	Thursday; 10 March 1796

décade 18
21	Friday; 11 March 1796
22	Saturday; 12 March 1796
23	Sunday; 13 March 1796
24	Monday; 14 March 1796
25	Tuesday; 15 March 1796
26	Wednesday; 16 March 1796
27	Thursday; 17 March 1796
28	Friday; 18 March 1796
29	Saturday; 19 March 1796
30	Sunday; 20 March 1796

Decimal time – 10 h/day
Paris
7:10:87

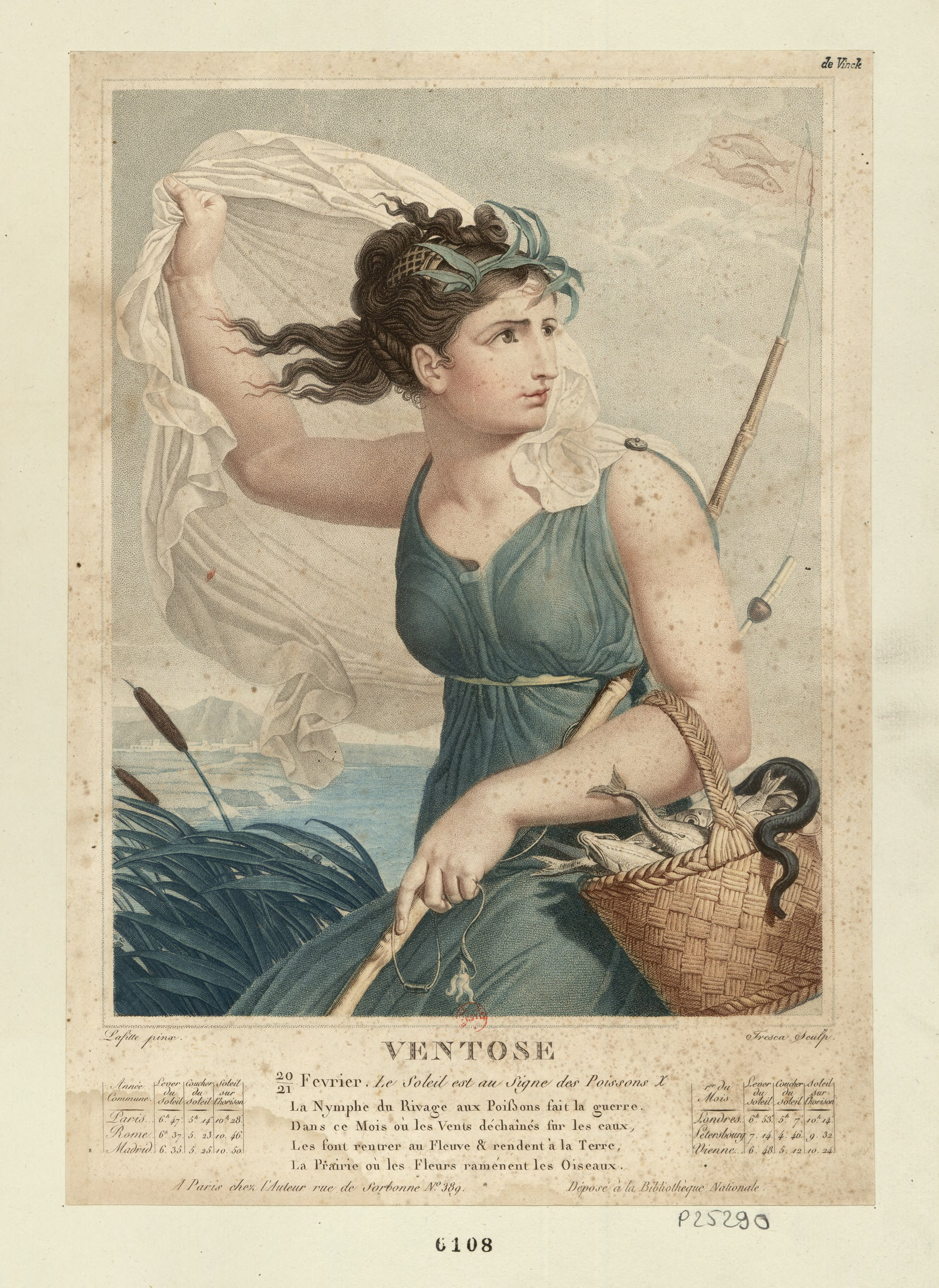
Ventôse

17:03:40
Time of day - 24 h/day
Greenwich

Year: 5
Month: Ventôse
Year: V

Day of the 10-day
week (décade)
Primidi
Duodi
Tridi
Quartidi
Quintidi
Sextidi
Septidi
Octidi
Nonidi
Décadi

décade 16
1	Sunday; 19 February 1797
2	Monday; 20 February 1797
3	Tuesday; 21 February 1797
4	Wednesday; 22 February 1797
5	Thursday; 23 February 1797
6	Friday; 24 February 1797
7	Saturday; 25 February 1797
8	Sunday; 26 February 1797
9	Monday; 27 February 1797
10	Tuesday; 28 February 1797

décade 17
11	Wednesday; 1 March 1797
12	Thursday; 2 March 1797
13	Friday; 3 March 1797
14	Saturday; 4 March 1797
15	Sunday; 5 March 1797
16	Monday; 6 March 1797
17	Tuesday; 7 March 1797
18	Wednesday; 8 March 1797
19	Thursday; 9 March 1797
20	Friday; 10 March 1797

décade 18
21	Saturday; 11 March 1797
22	Sunday; 12 March 1797
23	Monday; 13 March 1797
24	Tuesday; 14 March 1797
25	Wednesday; 15 March 1797
26	Thursday; 16 March 1797
27	Friday; 17 March 1797
28	Saturday; 18 March 1797
29	Sunday; 19 March 1797
30	Monday; 20 March 1797

Decimal time – 10 h/day
Paris
7:10:87

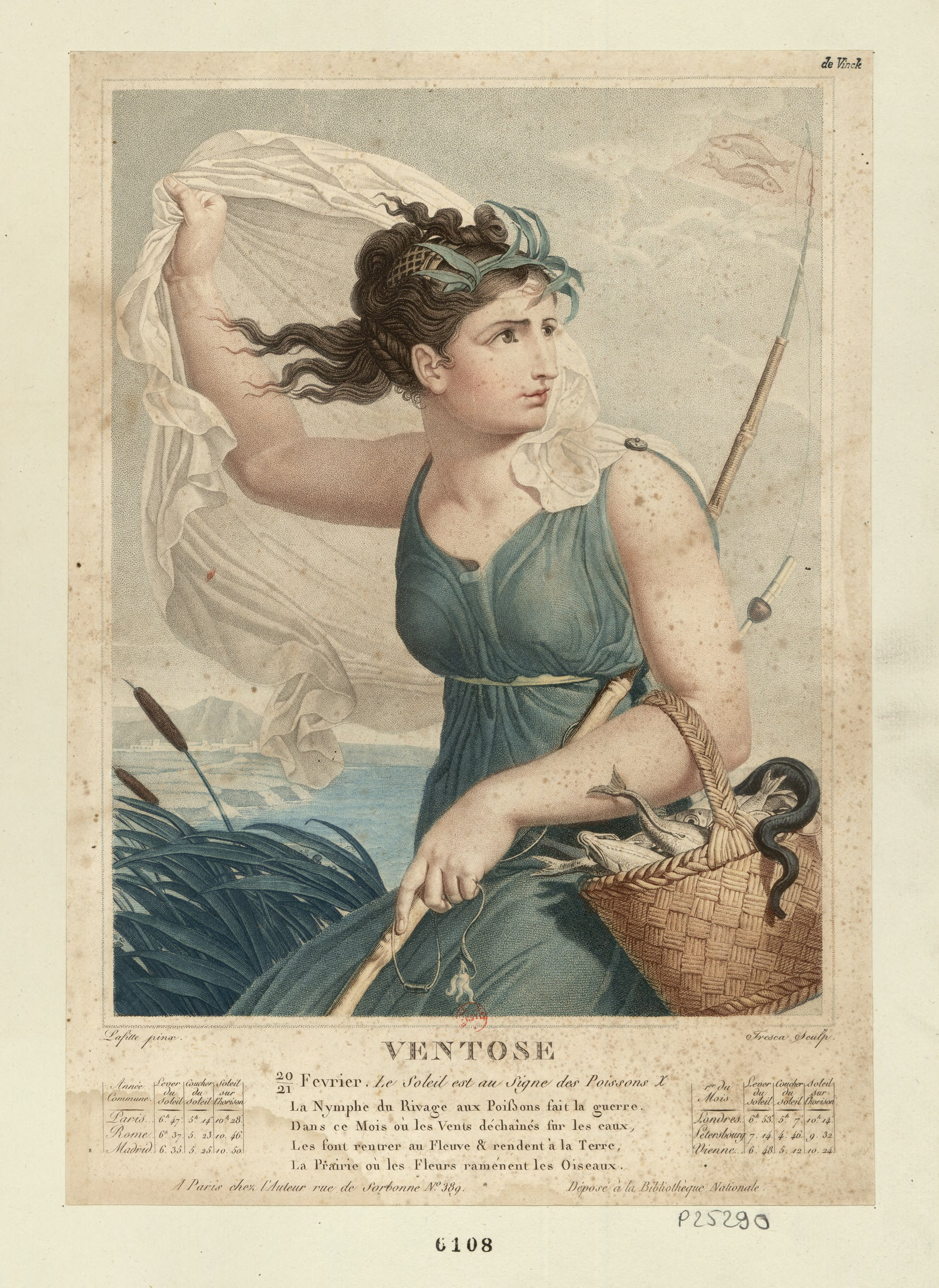
Ventôse

17:03:40
Time of day - 24 h/day
Greenwich

Year: 6
Month: Ventôse
Year: VI

Day of the 10-day
week (décade)
Primidi
Duodi
Tridi
Quartidi
Quintidi
Sextidi
Septidi
Octidi
Nonidi
Décadi

décade 16
1	Monday; 19 February 1798
2	Tuesday; 20 February 1798
3	Wednesday; 21 February 1798
4	Thursday; 22 February 1798
5	Friday; 23 February 1798
6	Saturday; 24 February 1798
7	Sunday; 25 February 1798
8	Monday; 26 February 1798
9	Tuesday; 27 February 1798
10	Wednesday; 28 February 1798

décade 17
11	Thursday; 1 March 1798
12	Friday; 2 March 1798
13	Saturday; 3 March 1798
14	Sunday; 4 March 1798
15	Monday; 5 March 1798
16	Tuesday; 6 March 1798
17	Wednesday; 7 March 1798
18	Thursday; 8 March 1798
19	Friday; 9 March 1798
20	Saturday; 10 March 1798

décade 18
21	Sunday; 11 March 1798
22	Monday; 12 March 1798
23	Tuesday; 13 March 1798
24	Wednesday; 14 March 1798
25	Thursday; 15 March 1798
26	Friday; 16 March 1798
27	Saturday; 17 March 1798
28	Sunday; 18 March 1798
29	Monday; 19 March 1798
30	Tuesday; 20 March 1798

Decimal time – 10 h/day
Paris
7:10:87

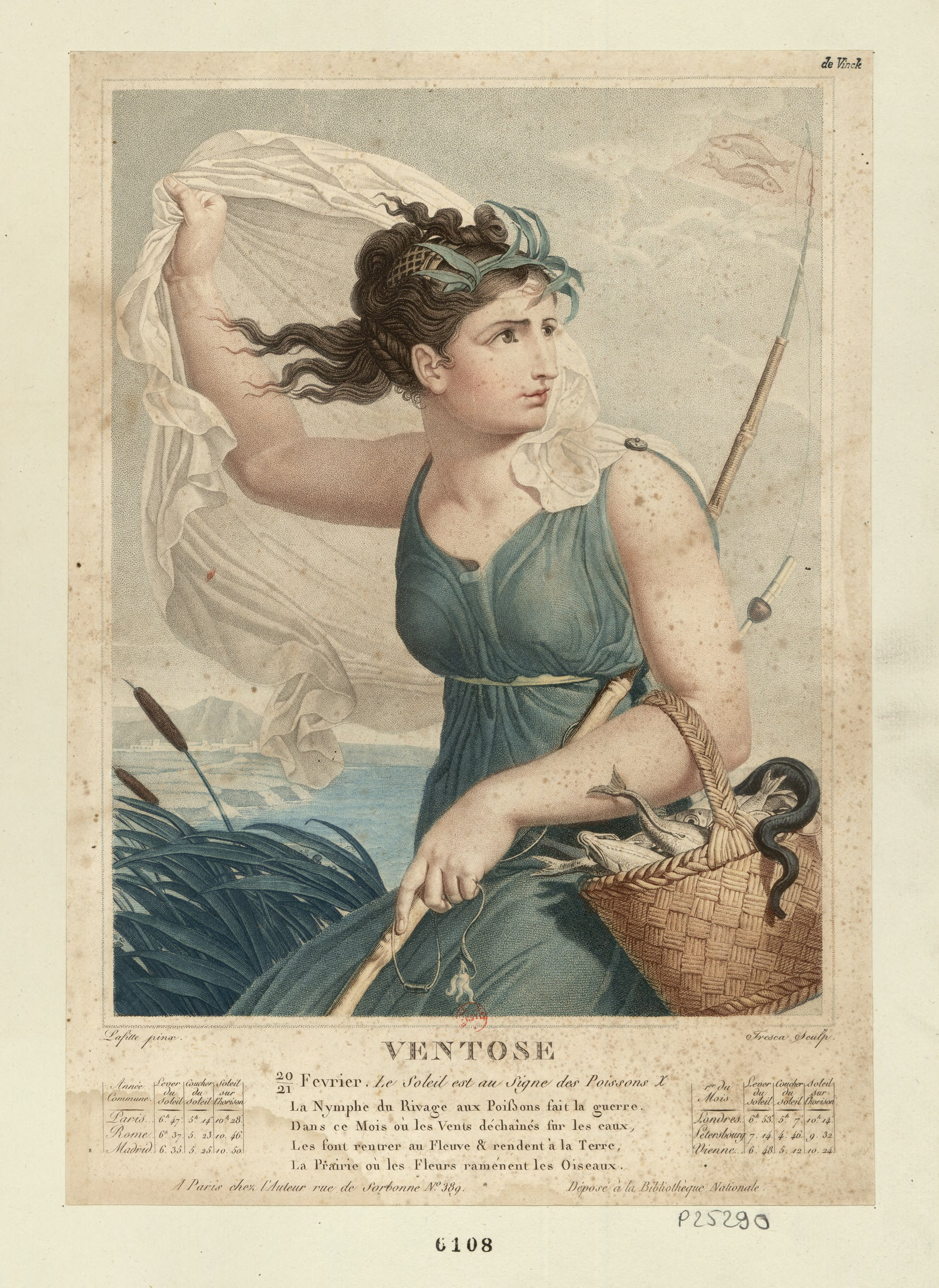
Ventôse

17:03:40
Time of day - 24 h/day
Greenwich

Year: 7
Month: Ventôse
Year: VII

Day of the 10-day
week (décade)
Primidi
Duodi
Tridi
Quartidi
Quintidi
Sextidi
Septidi
Octidi
Nonidi
Décadi

décade 16
1	Tuesday; 19 February 1799
2	Wednesday; 20 February 1799
3	Thursday; 21 February 1799
4	Friday; 22 February 1799
5	Saturday; 23 February 1799
6	Sunday; 24 February 1799
7	Monday; 25 February 1799
8	Tuesday; 26 February 1799
9	Wednesday; 27 February 1799
10	Thursday; 28 February 1799

décade 17
11	Friday; 1 March 1799
12	Saturday; 2 March 1799
13	Sunday; 3 March 1799
14	Monday; 4 March 1799
15	Tuesday; 5 March 1799
16	Wednesday; 6 March 1799
17	Thursday; 7 March 1799
18	Friday; 8 March 1799
19	Saturday; 9 March 1799
20	Sunday; 10 March 1799

décade 18
21	Monday; 11 March 1799
22	Tuesday; 12 March 1799
23	Wednesday; 13 March 1799
24	Thursday; 14 March 1799
25	Friday; 15 March 1799
26	Saturday; 16 March 1799
27	Sunday; 17 March 1799
28	Monday; 18 March 1799
29	Tuesday; 19 March 1799
30	Wednesday; 20 March 1799

Decimal time – 10 h/day
Paris
7:10:87

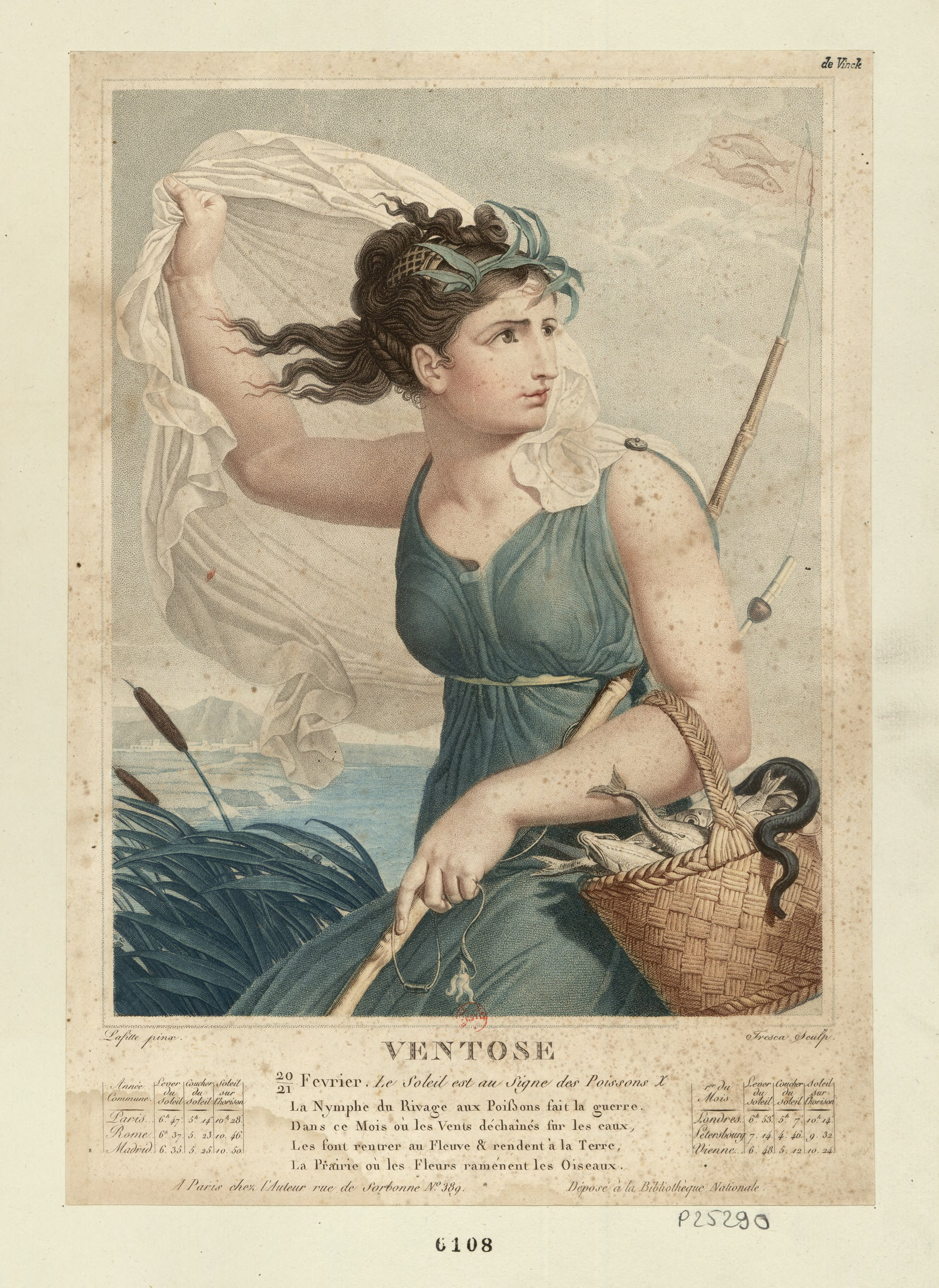
Ventôse

17:03:40
Time of day - 24 h/day
Greenwich

Year: 8
Month: Ventôse
Year: VIII

Day of the 10-day
week (décade)
Primidi
Duodi
Tridi
Quartidi
Quintidi
Sextidi
Septidi
Octidi
Nonidi
Décadi

décade 16
1	Thursday; 20 February 1800
2	Friday; 21 February 1800
3	Saturday; 22 February 1800
4	Sunday; 23 February 1800
5	Monday; 24 February 1800
6	Tuesday; 25 February 1800
7	Wednesday; 26 February 1800
8	Thursday; 27 February 1800
9	Friday; 28 February 1800
10	Saturday; 1 March 1800

décade 17
11	Sunday; 2 March 1800
12	Monday; 3 March 1800
13	Tuesday; 4 March 1800
14	Wednesday; 5 March 1800
15	Thursday; 6 March 1800
16	Friday; 7 March 1800
17	Saturday; 8 March 1800
18	Sunday; 9 March 1800
19	Monday; 10 March 1800
20	Tuesday; 11 March 1800

décade 18
21	Wednesday; 12 March 1800
22	Thursday; 13 March 1800
23	Friday; 14 March 1800
24	Saturday; 15 March 1800
25	Sunday; 16 March 1800
26	Monday; 17 March 1800
27	Tuesday; 18 March 1800
28	Wednesday; 19 March 1800
29	Thursday; 20 March 1800
30	Friday; 21 March 1800

Decimal time – 10 h/day
Paris
7:10:87

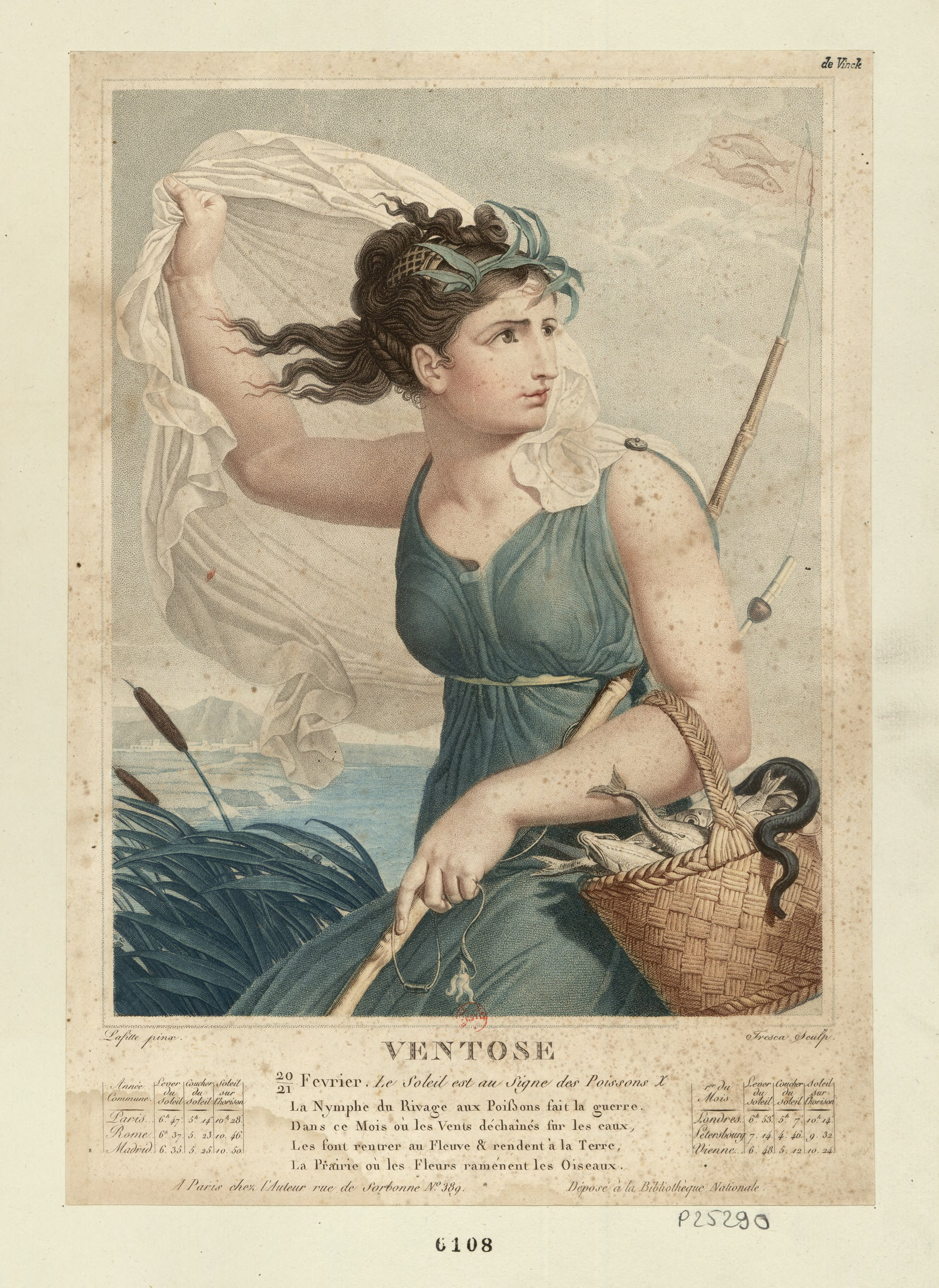
Ventôse

17:03:40
Time of day - 24 h/day
Greenwich

Year: 9
Month: Ventôse
Year: IX

Day of the 10-day
week (décade)
Primidi
Duodi
Tridi
Quartidi
Quintidi
Sextidi
Septidi
Octidi
Nonidi
Décadi

décade 16
1	Friday; 20 February 1801
2	Saturday; 21 February 1801
3	Sunday; 22 February 1801
4	Monday; 23 February 1801
5	Tuesday; 24 February 1801
6	Wednesday; 25 February 1801
7	Thursday; 26 February 1801
8	Friday; 27 February 1801
9	Saturday; 28 February 1801
10	Sunday; 1 March 1801

décade 17
11	Monday; 2 March 1801
12	Tuesday; 3 March 1801
13	Wednesday; 4 March 1801
14	Thursday; 5 March 1801
15	Friday; 6 March 1801
16	Saturday; 7 March 1801
17	Sunday; 8 March 1801
18	Monday; 9 March 1801
19	Tuesday; 10 March 1801
20	Wednesday; 11 March 1801

décade 18
21	Thursday; 12 March 1801
22	Friday; 13 March 1801
23	Saturday; 14 March 1801
24	Sunday; 15 March 1801
25	Monday; 16 March 1801
26	Tuesday; 17 March 1801
27	Wednesday; 18 March 1801
28	Thursday; 19 March 1801
29	Friday; 20 March 1801
30	Saturday; 21 March 1801

Decimal time – 10 h/day
Paris
7:10:87

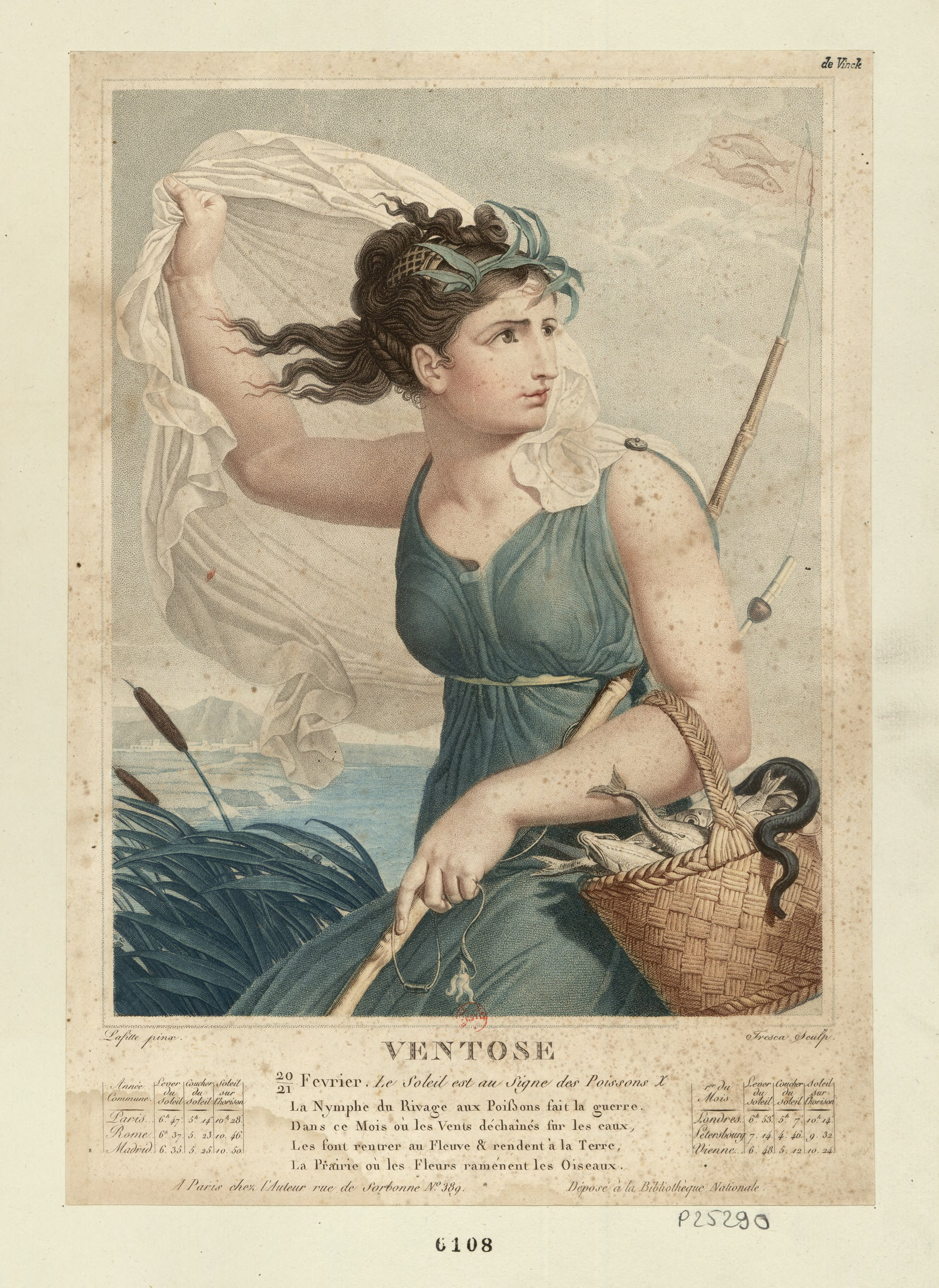
Ventôse

17:03:40
Time of day - 24 h/day
Greenwich

Year: 10
Month: Ventôse
Year: X

Day of the 10-day
week (décade)
Primidi
Duodi
Tridi
Quartidi
Quintidi
Sextidi
Septidi
Octidi
Nonidi
Décadi

décade 16
1	Saturday; 20 February 1802
2	Sunday; 21 February 1802
3	Monday; 22 February 1802
4	Tuesday; 23 February 1802
5	Wednesday; 24 February 1802
6	Thursday; 25 February 1802
7	Friday; 26 February 1802
8	Saturday; 27 February 1802
9	Sunday; 28 February 1802
10	Monday; 1 March 1802

décade 17
11	Tuesday; 2 March 1802
12	Wednesday; 3 March 1802
13	Thursday; 4 March 1802
14	Friday; 5 March 1802
15	Saturday; 6 March 1802
16	Sunday; 7 March 1802
17	Monday; 8 March 1802
18	Tuesday; 9 March 1802
19	Wednesday; 10 March 1802
20	Thursday; 11 March 1802

décade 18
21	Friday; 12 March 1802
22	Saturday; 13 March 1802
23	Sunday; 14 March 1802
24	Monday; 15 March 1802
25	Tuesday; 16 March 1802
26	Wednesday; 17 March 1802
27	Thursday; 18 March 1802
28	Friday; 19 March 1802
29	Saturday; 20 March 1802
30	Sunday; 21 March 1802

Decimal time – 10 h/day
Paris
7:10:87

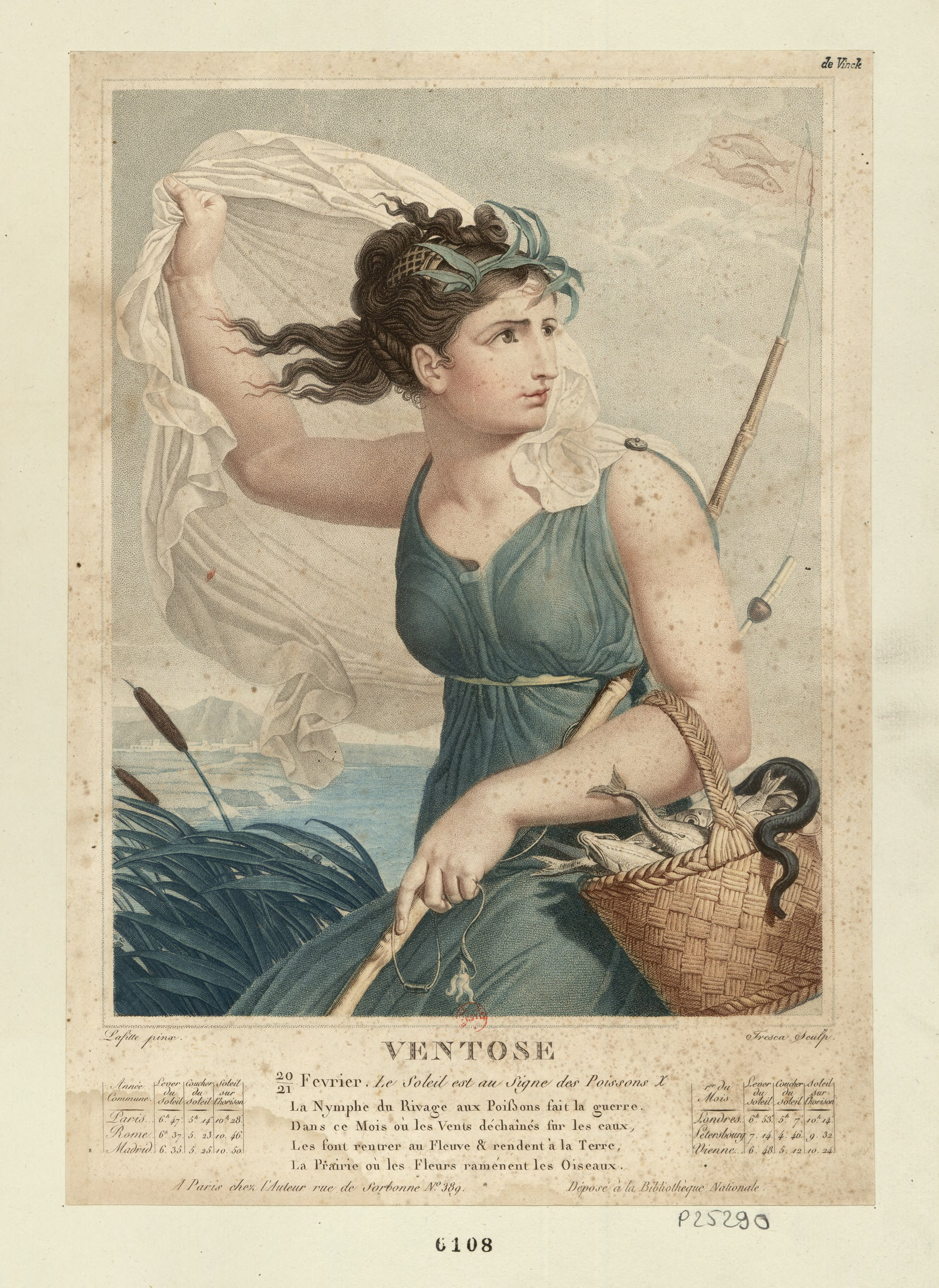
Ventôse

17:03:40
Time of day - 24 h/day
Greenwich

Year: 11
Month: Ventôse
Year: XI

Day of the 10-day
week (décade)
Primidi
Duodi
Tridi
Quartidi
Quintidi
Sextidi
Septidi
Octidi
Nonidi
Décadi

décade 16
1	Sunday; 20 February 1803
2	Monday; 21 February 1803
3	Tuesday; 22 February 1803
4	Wednesday; 23 February 1803
5	Thursday; 24 February 1803
6	Friday; 25 February 1803
7	Saturday; 26 February 1803
8	Sunday; 27 February 1803
9	Monday; 28 February 1803
10	Tuesday; 1 March 1803

décade 17
11	Wednesday; 2 March 1803
12	Thursday; 3 March 1803
13	Friday; 4 March 1803
14	Saturday; 5 March 1803
15	Sunday; 6 March 1803
16	Monday; 7 March 1803
17	Tuesday; 8 March 1803
18	Wednesday; 9 March 1803
19	Thursday; 10 March 1803
20	Friday; 11 March 1803

décade 18
21	Saturday; 12 March 1803
22	Sunday; 13 March 1803
23	Monday; 14 March 1803
24	Tuesday; 15 March 1803
25	Wednesday; 16 March 1803
26	Thursday; 17 March 1803
27	Friday; 18 March 1803
28	Saturday; 19 March 1803
29	Sunday; 20 March 1803
30	Monday; 21 March 1803

Decimal time – 10 h/day
Paris
7:10:87

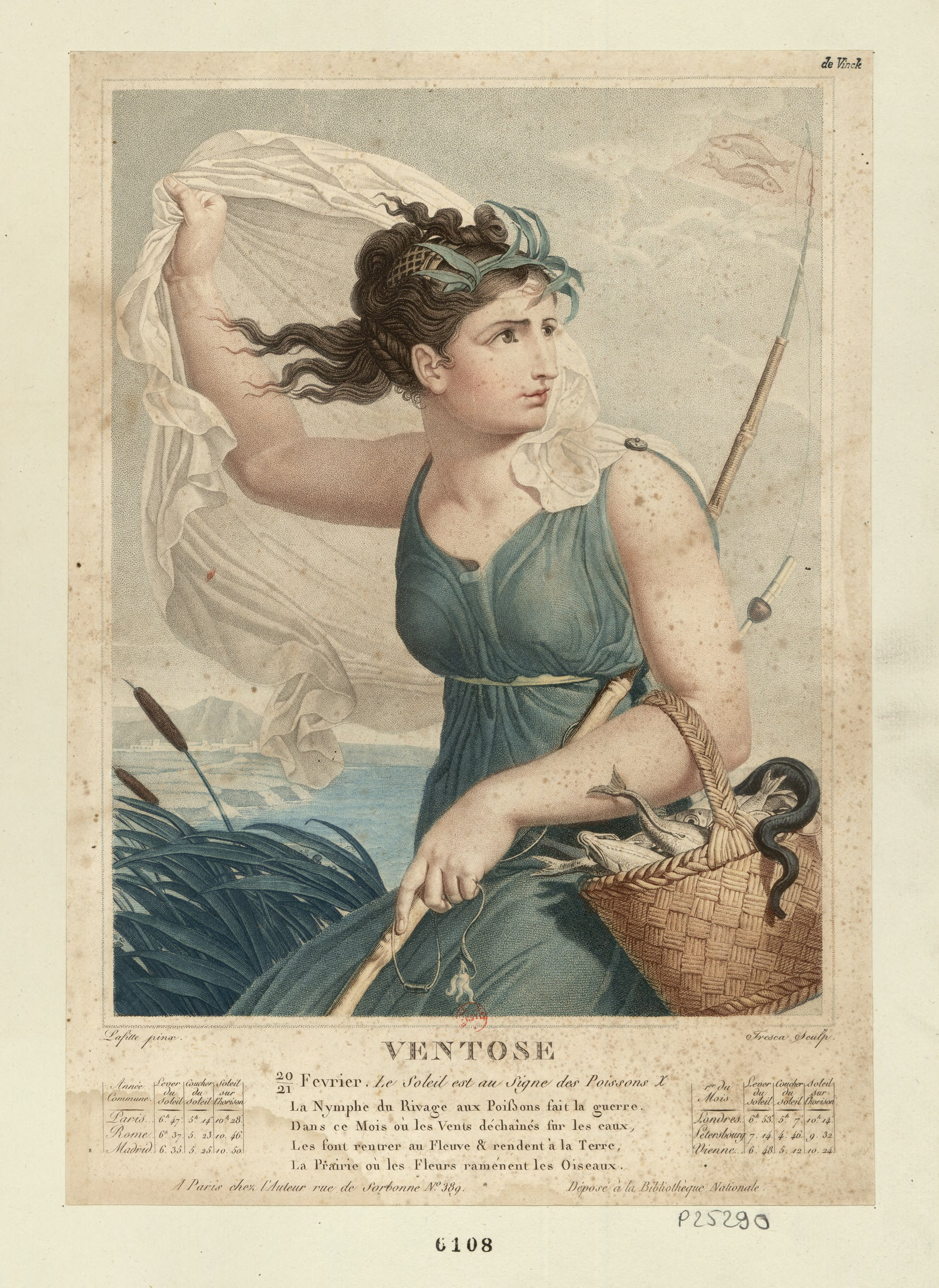
Ventôse

17:03:40
Time of day - 24 h/day
Greenwich

Year: 12
Month: Ventôse
Year: XII

Day of the 10-day
week (décade)
Primidi
Duodi
Tridi
Quartidi
Quintidi
Sextidi
Septidi
Octidi
Nonidi
Décadi

décade 16
1	Tuesday; 21 February 1804
2	Wednesday; 22 February 1804
3	Thursday; 23 February 1804
4	Friday; 24 February 1804
5	Saturday; 25 February 1804
6	Sunday; 26 February 1804
7	Monday; 27 February 1804
8	Tuesday; 28 February 1804
9	Wednesday; 29 February 1804
10	Thursday; 1 March 1804

décade 17
11	Friday; 2 March 1804
12	Saturday; 3 March 1804
13	Sunday; 4 March 1804
14	Monday; 5 March 1804
15	Tuesday; 6 March 1804
16	Wednesday; 7 March 1804
17	Thursday; 8 March 1804
18	Friday; 9 March 1804
19	Saturday; 10 March 1804
20	Sunday; 11 March 1804

décade 18
21	Monday; 12 March 1804
22	Tuesday; 13 March 1804
23	Wednesday; 14 March 1804
24	Thursday; 15 March 1804
25	Friday; 16 March 1804
26	Saturday; 17 March 1804
27	Sunday; 18 March 1804
28	Monday; 19 March 1804
29	Tuesday; 20 March 1804
30	Wednesday; 21 March 1804

Decimal time – 10 h/day
Paris
7:10:87

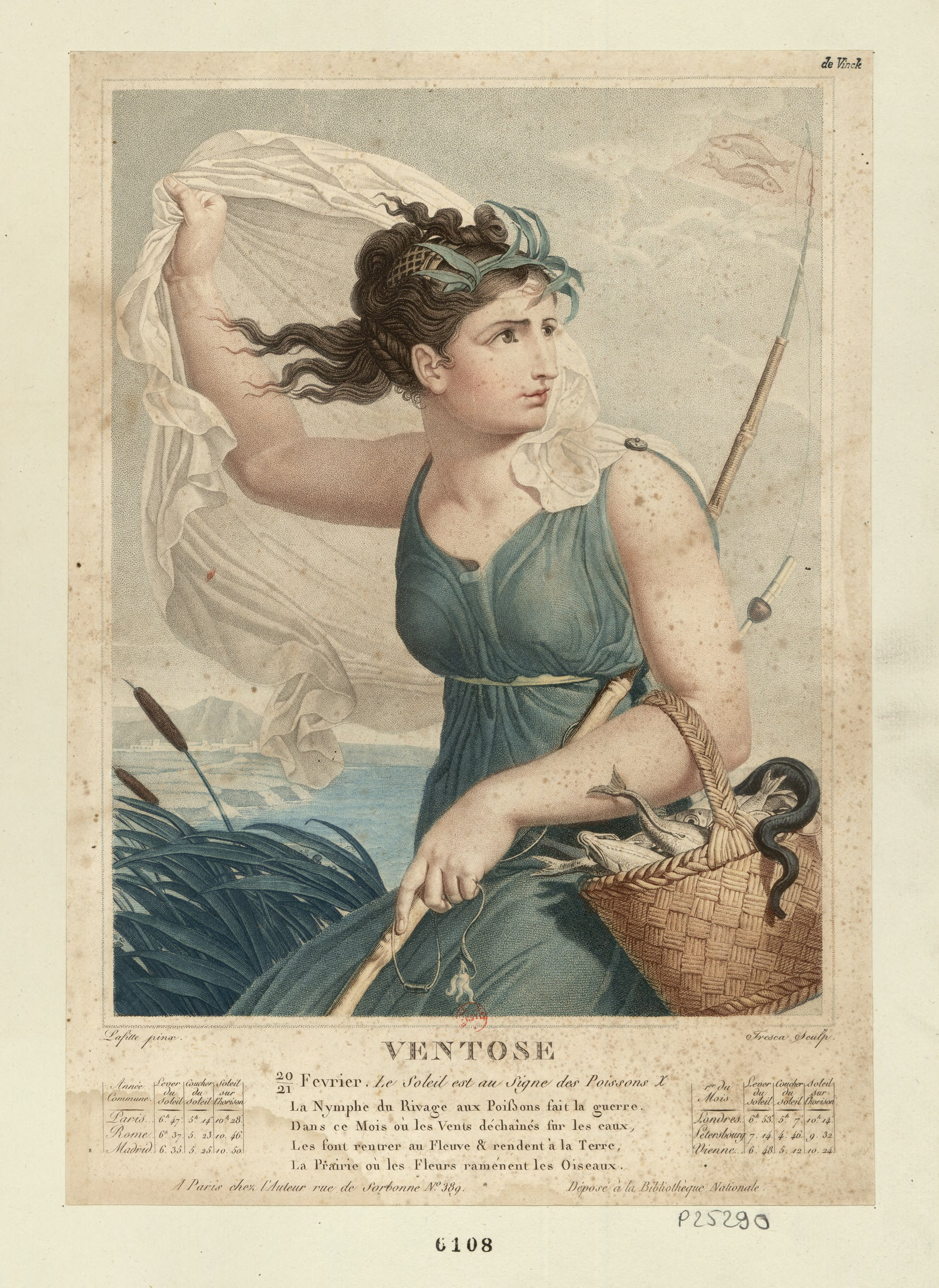
Ventôse

17:03:40
Time of day - 24 h/day
Greenwich

Year: 13
Month: Ventôse
Year: XIII

Day of the 10-day
week (décade)
Primidi
Duodi
Tridi
Quartidi
Quintidi
Sextidi
Septidi
Octidi
Nonidi
Décadi

décade 16
1	Wednesday; 20 February 1805
2	Thursday; 21 February 1805
3	Friday; 22 February 1805
4	Saturday; 23 February 1805
5	Sunday; 24 February 1805
6	Monday; 25 February 1805
7	Tuesday; 26 February 1805
8	Wednesday; 27 February 1805
9	Thursday; 28 February 1805
10	Friday; 1 March 1805

décade 17
11	Saturday; 2 March 1805
12	Sunday; 3 March 1805
13	Monday; 4 March 1805
14	Tuesday; 5 March 1805
15	Wednesday; 6 March 1805
16	Thursday; 7 March 1805
17	Friday; 8 March 1805
18	Saturday; 9 March 1805
19	Sunday; 10 March 1805
20	Monday; 11 March 1805

décade 18
21	Tuesday; 12 March 1805
22	Wednesday; 13 March 1805
23	Thursday; 14 March 1805
24	Friday; 15 March 1805
25	Saturday; 16 March 1805
26	Sunday; 17 March 1805
27	Monday; 18 March 1805
28	Tuesday; 19 March 1805
29	Wednesday; 20 March 1805
30	Thursday; 21 March 1805

Decimal time – 10 h/day
Paris
7:10:87

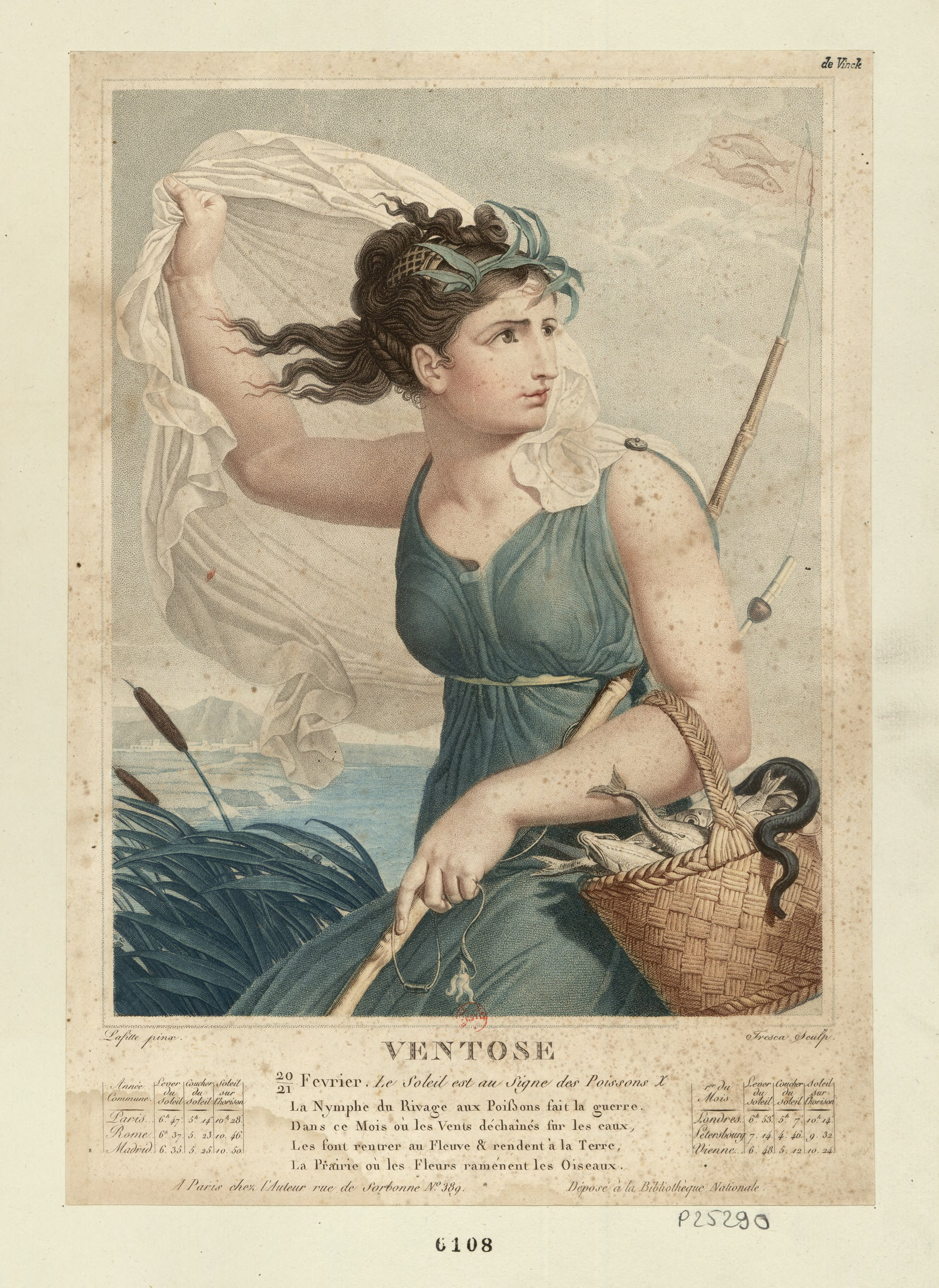
Ventôse

17:03:40
Time of day - 24 h/day
Greenwich

Year: 14
Month: Ventôse
Year: XIV

Day of the 10-day
week (décade)
Primidi
Duodi
Tridi
Quartidi
Quintidi
Sextidi
Septidi
Octidi
Nonidi
Décadi

décade 16
1	Thursday; 20 February 1806
2	Friday; 21 February 1806
3	Saturday; 22 February 1806
4	Sunday; 23 February 1806
5	Monday; 24 February 1806
6	Tuesday; 25 February 1806
7	Wednesday; 26 February 1806
8	Thursday; 27 February 1806
9	Friday; 28 February 1806
10	Saturday; 1 March 1806

décade 17
11	Sunday; 2 March 1806
12	Monday; 3 March 1806
13	Tuesday; 4 March 1806
14	Wednesday; 5 March 1806
15	Thursday; 6 March 1806
16	Friday; 7 March 1806
17	Saturday; 8 March 1806
18	Sunday; 9 March 1806
19	Monday; 10 March 1806
20	Tuesday; 11 March 1806

décade 18
21	Wednesday; 12 March 1806
22	Thursday; 13 March 1806
23	Friday; 14 March 1806
24	Saturday; 15 March 1806
25	Sunday; 16 March 1806
26	Monday; 17 March 1806
27	Tuesday; 18 March 1806
28	Wednesday; 19 March 1806
29	Thursday; 20 March 1806
30	Friday; 21 March 1806

Decimal time – 10 h/day
Paris
7:10:87

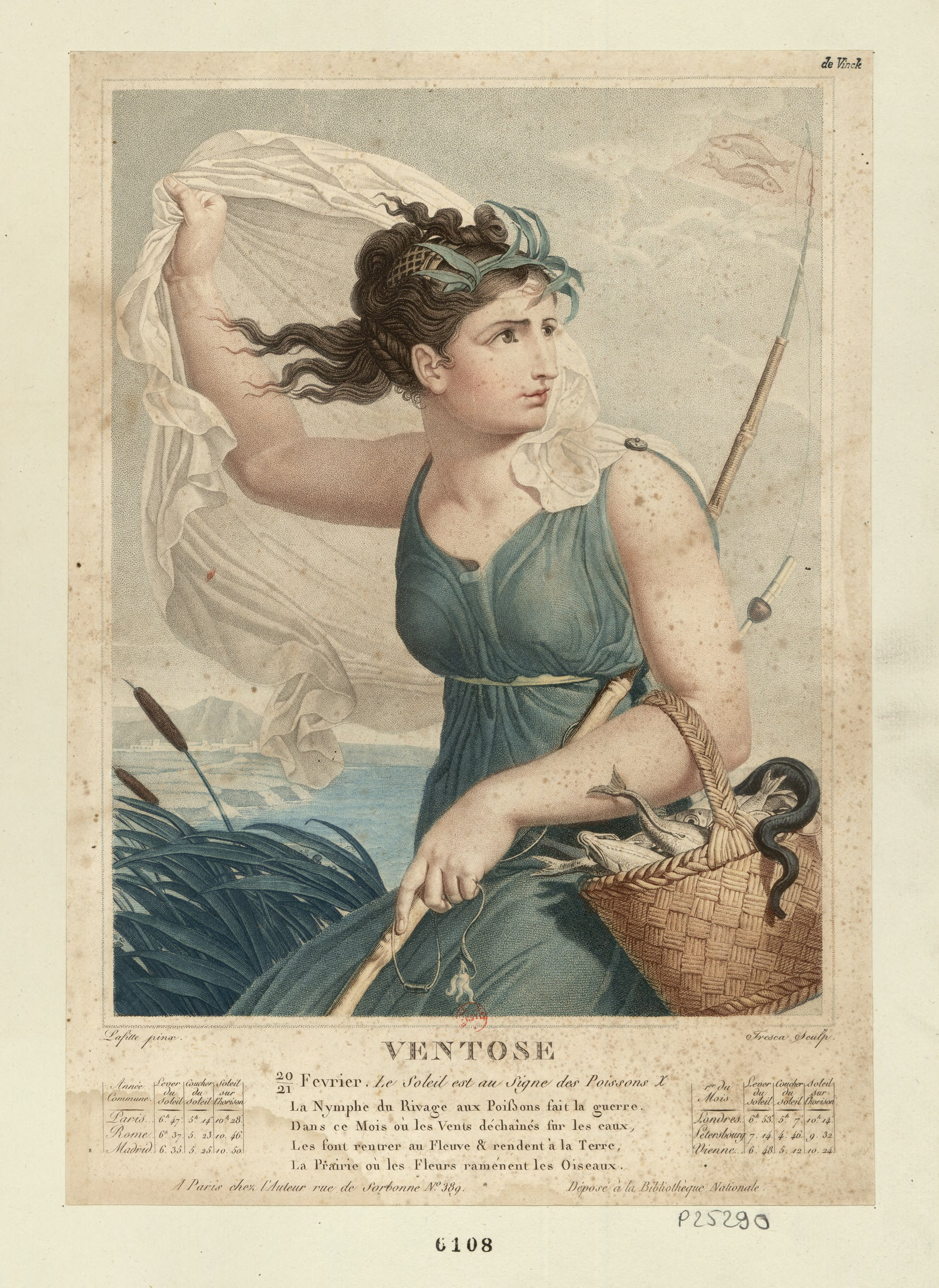
Ventôse

17:03:40
Time of day - 24 h/day
Greenwich

== Day name table ==
Like all FRC months, Ventôse lasted 30 days and was divided into three 10-day weeks called décades (decades). Every day was given the name of an agricultural plant, except the 5th (Quintidi) and 10th day (Decadi) of every decade, which had the name of a domestic animal (Quintidi) or an agricultural tool (Decadi).

	1^{re} Décade		2^{e} Décade		3^{e} Décade
Primidi	1.	Tussilage (Coltsfoot)	11.	Narcisse (Narcissus)	21.	Mandragore (Mandrake)
Duodi	2.	Cornouiller (Dogwood)	12.	Orme (Elm)	22.	Percil (Parsley)
Tridi	3.	Viollier (Stock)	13.	Fumeterre (Fumitory)	23.	Cochléria (Scurvygrass)
Quartidi	4.	Troëne (Privet)	14.	Vélar (Hedge Mustard)	24.	Pâquerette (Daisy)
Quintidi	5.	Bouc (Billygoat)	15.	Chèvre (Goat)	25.	Thon (Tuna)
Sextidi	6.	Asaret (Wild Ginger)	16.	Epinard (Spinach)	26.	Pissenlit (Dandelion)
Septidi	7.	Alaterne (Evergreen Buckthorn)	17.	Doronic (Leopard's Bane)	27.	Sylvie (Anemone)
Octidi	8.	Violette (Violet)	18.	Mouron (Pimpernel)	28.	Capillaire (Maidenhair Fern)
Nonidi	9.	Marceau (Willow)	19.	Cerfeuil (Chervil)	29.	Frêne (Ash Tree)
Decadi	10.	Bêche (Spade)	20.	Cordeau (Twine)	30.	Plantoir (Dibble)

== Conversion table ==
Table for conversion between Republican and Gregorian Calendar
for the month "Ventôse"

I. / II. / III. / V. / VI. / VII.
1	2	3	4	5	6	7	8	9	10	11	12	13	14	15	16	17	18	19	20	21	22	23	24	25	26	27	28	29	30
19	20	21	22	23	24	25	26	27	28	1	2	3	4	5	6	7	8	9	10	11	12	13	14	15	16	17	18	19	20
February / 1793 / 1794 / 1795 / 1797 / 1798 / 1799 / March

IV.
1	2	3	4	5	6	7	8	9	10	11	12	13	14	15	16	17	18	19	20	21	22	23	24	25	26	27	28	29	30
20	21	22	23	24	25	26	27	28	29	1	2	3	4	5	6	7	8	9	10	11	12	13	14	15	16	17	18	19	20
February / 1796 / March

VIII. / IX. / X. / XI. / XIII.
1	2	3	4	5	6	7	8	9	10	11	12	13	14	15	16	17	18	19	20	21	22	23	24	25	26	27	28	29	30
20	21	22	23	24	25	26	27	28	1	2	3	4	5	6	7	8	9	10	11	12	13	14	15	16	17	18	19	20	21
February / 1800 / 1801 / 1802 / 1803 / 1805 / March

XII.
1	2	3	4	5	6	7	8	9	10	11	12	13	14	15	16	17	18	19	20	21	22	23	24	25	26	27	28	29	30
21	22	23	24	25	26	27	28	29	1	2	3	4	5	6	7	8	9	10	11	12	13	14	15	16	17	18	19	20	21
February / 1804 / March
