= Internet calendar =

Internet calendar may refer to:

- the iCalendar file format
- Swatch Internet Time
