= Claude Boniface Collignon =

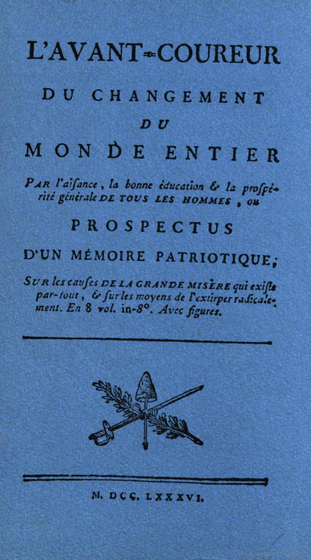

Claude Boniface Collignon (died 1819) was a French attorney who contributed to scientific and social reforms in the time of the French Revolution. He was a member of several European academies of sciences, though not the French Academy of Sciences. In 1788 he proposed the introduction of decimal time. In 1790, perhaps disappointed that the French government had not immediately rewarded him for the plan, he sent his book to George Washington, and proposed to introduce his system in the US.
