= Decimal calendar =

Calendar whose units are based on the decimal system

A decimal calendar is a calendar which includes units of time based on the decimal system. For example, a "decimal month" would consist of a year with 10 months and 36.52422 days per month.

== History ==
=== Egyptian calendar ===
The ancient Egyptian calendar consisted of twelve months, each divided into three weeks of ten days, with five intercalary days.

=== Calendar of Romulus ===
The original Roman calendar consisted of ten months; however, the calendar year only lasted 304 days, with 61 days during winter not assigned to any month. The months of Ianuarius and Februarius were added to the calendar by Numa Pompilius in 700 BCE.

=== French Republican Calendar ===
The French Republican Calendar was introduced (along with decimal time) in 1793, and was similar to the ancient Egyptian calendar. It consisted of twelve months, each divided into three décades of ten days, with five or six intercalary days called sansculottides. The calendar was abolished by Napoleon on January 1, 1806.

== Proposals ==
The modern Gregorian calendar does not use decimal units of time; however, several proposed calendar systems do. None of these have achieved widespread use.

== See also ==
- Decimal time
