= Nation.1 =

Nation1
- Established: July 15, 1997

Nation.1 was a project to create what was described as an "online country", a conceptual country based on the Internet. It citizens were to be the kids of the world, "not defined by geography or birthright, but by age". It ultimately enrolled people under 25. The central goal of Nation.1 was to empower young people with a voice and representation in world affairs.

In March 2002, Nation.1 merged with TakingITGlobal, an online network of young people, and encouraged its "online citizens" to transfer their accounts to the new platform.

== History ==
The Nation.1 concept began as a challenge by Nicholas Negroponte to a group of young delegates of the 2B1 conference at the MIT Media Lab in 1997. Several of these delegates had attended the GII Junior Summit in 1995, and others were part of the Generation Why Project in Olympia, Washington.

Nation.1 was announced publicly in a 1997 teleconference to the United Nations Committee on the Rights of the Child, in a series of speeches at the Massachusetts State House and in an article in Wired magazine. The project was further developed by delegates at the Junior Summit 1998 conference, during which it adopted the use of Swatch Internet Time. In the following years Nation.1 was incorporated as a non-profit organization for youth empowerment.

In 1999 they started two petitions: one called "No War", asking world leaders to halt armed conflict; and another called "Stop Child Labor". Their website presented a section for users to join discussions about the "Crisis in Kosovo". They also released an online document Declaration of Nation1 Organization.

The Nation.1 foundation, its executive director and its assets merged officially with TakingITGlobal in 2001.

Although Nation.1 is not directly related to the One Laptop per Child project, both projects were informed by the 2B1 conference, the GII Junior Summit '95 and the Junior Summit '98.

The Nation.1 project explored a variety of translation and governance technologies as well as a variety of concepts key to the construction of a country. New approaches to youth-empowerment and autonomous self-government through the use of decentralized internet voting systems were discussed, as were topics relating to citizenship, education, economic exchange, trust, identification, and a usable international definition on what constitutes childhood.

On this last question, an arbitrary boundary of 25 years of age and under was eventually established, although the variables of this boundary were widely discussed. John Perry Barlow put in a request that the young at heart be admitted as ambassadors from the adult world, or at least be granted temporary visas.

== Technology ==
Alan Kay recommended using a wiki in the formation of Nation.1, three years before the founding of Wikipedia. His advice led to the use of a wiki to help form the founding texts of the nation. A database-driven website and email mailing lists were used as the initial communication system, while the central committee laid plans for multi-lingual chat system and a distributed decision-making system called the Democracy Engine.

Their online platform evolved during Nation.1's existence: by 1998, just one year after creation, it presented discussion forums and a mailing list users could subscribe to, as well as a call for translators. Early proposed website interfaces also presented a voting area.

In July 2001, prior to the merging with TakingITGlobal, their website presented a web chat that "automatically translates "live" between the world's major languages".

== Key people ==
- John Perry Barlow
- Brandon Bruce
- Terah DeJong
- Marco D'Alimonte
- Maitreyi Doshi
- Talena Foster
- Alan Kay
- Lauren Keane
- Hayley Goodwin
- Ragni Marea Kidvai
- Kanetaka Maki
- Nick Moraitis
- Nicholas Negroponte
- Dimitri Negroponte
- Thomas O'Duffy
- Laetitia Garriott de Cayeux
- Ryan Powell
- Warren Sack
- David Sontag
- Tannie Kwong
- Emily Kumpel
- Gerald Tan
- Nusrah Wali
- Ian Wojtowicz
- Jacob Wolfsheimer

== See also ==
- A Declaration of the Independence of Cyberspace
- Nationalism
- 2B1
