= Metric time =

Measure of time intervals using the metric system

Metric time is the measure of time intervals using the metric system. The modern form of the metric system, the SI, defines the second as the base unit of time, and forms multiples and submultiples with metric prefixes such as kiloseconds and milliseconds. Metric time is a measure of time intervals, while decimal time is a means of recording time of day.

== History ==
The second is derived from the sexagesimal system, which originated with the Sumerians and Babylonians. This system divides a base unit into sixty minutes, each minute into sixty seconds, and each second into sixty tierces. The word "minute" comes from the Latin pars minuta prima, meaning "first small part", and "second" from pars minuta secunda or "second small part". Angular measure also uses sexagesimal units; there, it is the degree that is subdivided into minutes and seconds, while in time, it is the hour.

In 1790, French diplomat Charles Maurice de Talleyrand-Périgord proposed that the fundamental unit of length for the metric system should be the length of a pendulum with a one-second period, measured at sea level on the 45th parallel (50 grades in the new angular measures), thus basing the metric system on the value of the second. A Commission of Weights and Measures was formed within the French Academy of Sciences to develop the system. The commission rejected the seconds-pendulum definition of the metre the following year because the second of time was an arbitrary period equal to 1/86,400 day, rather than a decimal fraction of a natural unit. Instead, the metre would be defined as a decimal fraction of the length of the Paris Meridian between the equator and the North Pole.

The commission initially proposed the decimal time units later enacted as part of the new Republican calendar. In January, 1791, Jean-Charles de Borda commissioned Louis Berthoud to manufacture a decimal chronometer displaying these units. On March 28, 1794, the commission's president, Joseph Louis Lagrange, proposed using the day (French jour) as the base unit of time, with divisions déci-jour and centi-jour, and suggested representing 4 déci-jours and 5 centi-jours as "4,5", "4/5", or just "45". The final system, as introduced in 1795, included units for length, area, dry volume, liquid capacity, weight or mass, and currency, but not time. Decimal time of day had been introduced in France two years earlier, but mandatory use was suspended at the same time the metric system was inaugurated, and did not follow the metric pattern of a base unit and prefixed units.

Base units equivalent to decimal divisions of the day, such as 1/10, 1/100, 1/1,000, or 1/100,000 day, or other divisions of the day, such as 1/20 or 1/40 day, have also been proposed, with various names. Such alternative units did not gain any notable acceptance. In China, during the Song dynasty, a day was divided into smaller units, called kè (刻). One kè was usually defined as 1/100 of a day until 1628, though there were short periods before then where days had 96, 108 or 120 kè. A kè is about 14.4 minutes, or 14 minutes 24 seconds. In the 19th century, Joseph Charles François de Rey-Pailhade endorsed Lagrange's proposal of using centijours, but abbreviated cé, and divided into 10 decicés, 100 centicés, 1,000 millicés, and 10,000 dimicés.

James Clerk Maxwell and Elihu Thomson (through the British Association for the Advancement of Science, or BAAS) introduced the Centimetre gram second system of units in 1874 to derive electric and magnetic metric units, following the recommendation of Carl Friedrich Gauss in 1832.

In 1897, the Commission de décimalisation du temps was created by the French Bureau of Longitude, with the mathematician Henri Poincaré as secretary. The commission proposed making the standard hour the base unit of metric time, but the proposal did not gain acceptance and was eventually abandoned.

When the modern SI system was defined at the 10th General Conference on Weights and Measures (CGPM) in 1954, the ephemeris second (1/86400 of a mean solar day) was made one of the system's base units. Because the Earth's rotation is slowly decelerating at an irregular rate and was thus unsuitable as a reference point for precise measurements, the SI second was later redefined more precisely as the duration of 9,192,631,770 periods of the radiation corresponding to the transition between the two hyperfine levels of the ground state of the caesium-133 atom. The international standard atomic clocks use caesium-133 measurements as their main benchmark.

== In computing ==
In computing, at least internally, metric time gained widespread use for ease of computation. Unix time gives date and time as the number of seconds since January 1, 1970, and Microsoft's NTFS FILETIME as multiples of 100 ns since January 1, 1601. VAX/VMS uses the number of 100 ns since November 17, 1858, and RISC OS the number of centiseconds since January 1, 1900. Microsoft Excel uses number of days (with decimals, floating point) since January 1, 1900.

All these systems present time for the user using traditional units. None of these systems is strictly linear, as they each have discontinuities at leap seconds.

== Prefixes ==
Metric prefixes for subdivisions of a second are commonly used in science and technology. Milliseconds and microseconds are particularly common. Prefixes for multiples of a second are rarely used:

Multiple	Name of unit	Seconds	In common units
10^{1}	decasecond	10	10 seconds
10^{2}	hectosecond	100	1 minute 40 seconds
10^{3}	kilosecond	1000	16 minutes and 40 seconds
10^{6}	megasecond	1000000	11.6 days
10^{9}	gigasecond	1000000000	31.7 years

== See also ==
- List of unusual units of measurement#Time, under which prefixed multiples of the second are included
- Soviet calendar
