= Swatch Internet Time =

Alternative time system by watch maker Swatch

Time (Note: at page generation)
- Logo of Swatch Internet Time
- 24-hour time (UTC): 14:11:58
- 24-hour time (CET): 15:11:58 CET
- .beat time (BMT): @633

Swatch Internet Time (or .beat time) is a decimal time system introduced in 1998 by the Swatch corporation as part of the marketing campaign for their line of ".beat" watches. Those without a watch could use the Internet to view the current time on the watchmaker's website or third-party websites. The concept of .beat time is similar to decimal minutes in French Revolutionary decimal time.

Instead of hours and minutes, in Swatch Time the mean solar day is divided into 1,000 equal parts called .beats, meaning each .beat lasts 86.4 seconds (1.440 minutes) in standard time, and an hour lasts for approximately 42 .beats. The time of day always references the amount of time that has passed since midnight (standard time) in Biel/Bienne, Switzerland, where Swatch is headquartered. For example, @248 BEATS indicates a time 248 .beats after midnight, or 248/1000 of a day (just over 5 hours and 57 minutes; or 5:57 AM UTC+1).

There are no time zones in Swatch Internet Time; it is a globally unified timekeeping system based on what Swatch calls "Biel Mean Time" (BMT), the time zone conventionally known as Central European Time or West Africa Time. It is based on the time zone and not the actual mean solar time measured in Biel/Bienne. Unlike civil time in Switzerland and many other countries, Swatch Internet Time has never observed daylight saving time (DST), even before more recent decisions to abandon DST in certain locales.

== History ==
Swatch Internet Time was announced on 23 October 1998, in a ceremony at the Junior Summit '98, attended by Nicolas G. Hayek, president and CEO of the Swatch Group, G.N. Hayek, president of Swatch Ltd., and Nicholas Negroponte, founder and then director of the MIT Media Lab. During the summit, Swatch Internet Time became the official time system for Nation.1, an online country (supposedly) created and run by children.

=== Uses ===
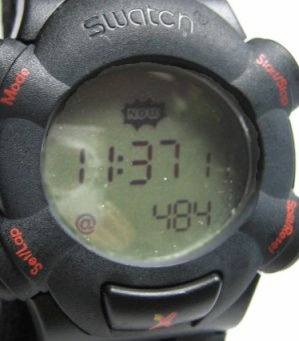
A Swatch watch showing .beat time in the bottom part of the display

During 1999, Swatch produced several models of watch, branded "Swatch .beat", that displayed Swatch Internet Time as well as standard time, and even convinced a few websites (such as CNN.com) to use the new format. PHP's idate() function has a format specifier, 'B', which returns the Swatch Internet Time notation for a given time stamp. It was also used as a time reference on ICQ, and the online role-playing game Phantasy Star Online used it since its launch on the Dreamcast in 2000 to try to facilitate cross-continent gaming (as the game allowed Japanese, American and European players to mingle on the same servers). In March 2001, Ericsson released the T20e, a mobile phone which gave the user the option of displaying Internet Time. Outside these areas, it is infrequently used. While Swatch still offers the concept on its website, it no longer markets Beat watches. In July 2016, Swatch released Touch Zero Two, its second wirelessly connected watch, with Swatch Internet Time function.

=== Beatnik satellite controversy ===
In early 1999, Swatch began a marketing campaign about the launch of their Beatnik satellite, intended to service a set of Internet Time watches. They were criticized for planning to use an amateur radio frequency for broadcasting a commercial message (an act banned by international treaties). The satellite was intended to be deployed by hand from the Mir space station. Swatch instead donated the transmitter batteries for use in normal Mir functions, and the satellite never broadcast.

== Description ==
The concept was touted as an alternative decimal measure of time. One of the supposed goals was to simplify the way people in different time zones communicate about time, mostly by eliminating time zones altogether. It also does away with the division of the day into 12 or 24 parts (hours), then 60 parts (minutes), then 60 parts (seconds), then 1000 parts (milliseconds). Furthermore, there is no confusion between the AM/PM system and 24-hour time.

=== Beats ===
.beats per unit of time
Unit	Beats conversion
1 day	1,000 .beats
1 hour	41.6 .beats
1 min 26.4 s	1 .beat
1 min	0.694 .beats
1 s	0.011574 .beats

Instead of hours and minutes, the mean solar day is divided into 1,000 parts called .beats. Each .beat lasts 1 minute and 26.4 seconds. One .beat is equal to one decimal minute in French decimal time.

Although Swatch does not specify units smaller than one .beat, third party implementations have extended the standard by adding "centibeats" or "sub-beats", for extended precision: @248.00. Each "centibeat" is a hundredth of a .beat and is therefore equal to one French decimal second (0.864 seconds).

=== Time zones ===
There are no time zones; instead, the new time scale of Biel Mean Time (BMT) is used, based on the company's headquarters in Biel/Bienne, Switzerland. Despite the name, BMT does not refer to mean solar time at the Biel/Bienne meridian (7°15′E), but to the standard time there. It is equivalent to Central European Time and West Africa Time, or UTC+1.

Like UTC, Swatch Internet Time is the same throughout the world. For example, when the time is 875 .beats, or @875, in New York, it is also @875 in Tokyo. Unlike civil time in most European countries, Internet Time does not observe daylight saving time, and thus it matches Central European Time during (European) winter and Western European Summer Time, which is observed by the United Kingdom, Ireland, Portugal and Spain's Canary Islands during summer.

=== Notation ===
The most distinctive aspect of Swatch Internet Time is its notation; as an example, "@248" would indicate a time 248 .beats after midnight, equivalent to a fractional day of 0.248 CET, or 04:57:07.2 UTC. No explicit format was provided for dates, although the Swatch website formerly displayed the Gregorian calendar date in the order day-month-year, separated by periods and prefixed by the letter d (e.g. d31.01.99).

=== Calculation from UTC+1 ===
The formula for calculating the time in .beats from UTC+1 is:

$$\left\lfloor\frac{3600h+60m+s}{86.4}\right\rfloor,$$

Where h is UTC+1 hours and m is UTC+1 minutes. The result is rounded down.

=== Start of the day ===
Example cities across the globe at @000 (midnight):

@000 BEATS
City	Time	Time zone	UTC offset
San Francisco	3:00 PM / 15:00	PST	UTC-8
San Francisco	4:00 PM / 16:00	PDT	UTC-7
New York	6:00 PM / 18:00	EST	UTC-5
New York	7:00 PM / 19:00	EDT	UTC-4
London	11:00 PM / 23:00	GMT	UTC
London	12:00 AM / 00:00	BST	UTC+1
Biel/Bienne	12:00 AM / 00:00	CET	UTC+1
Biel/Bienne	1:00 AM / 01:00	CEST	UTC+2
Tokyo	8:00 AM / 08:00	JST	UTC+9
Sydney	9:00 AM / 09:00	AEST	UTC+10
Sydney	10:00 AM / 10:00	AEDT	UTC+11

== See also ==
- Traditional Chinese timekeeping – 1 kè = 10 'beats'
- Metric time
- New Earth Time
- Unix time
