= Decimal time =

Time of day using decimal units

Times are in different time zones.
At 23:08:42 UTC 28 July 2026
Format	Decimal time	Zone
French	9^{h} 70^{m} 86^{s}	Paris MT
Fraction	0.96437 d	GMT/UTC
Swatch beats	@6	

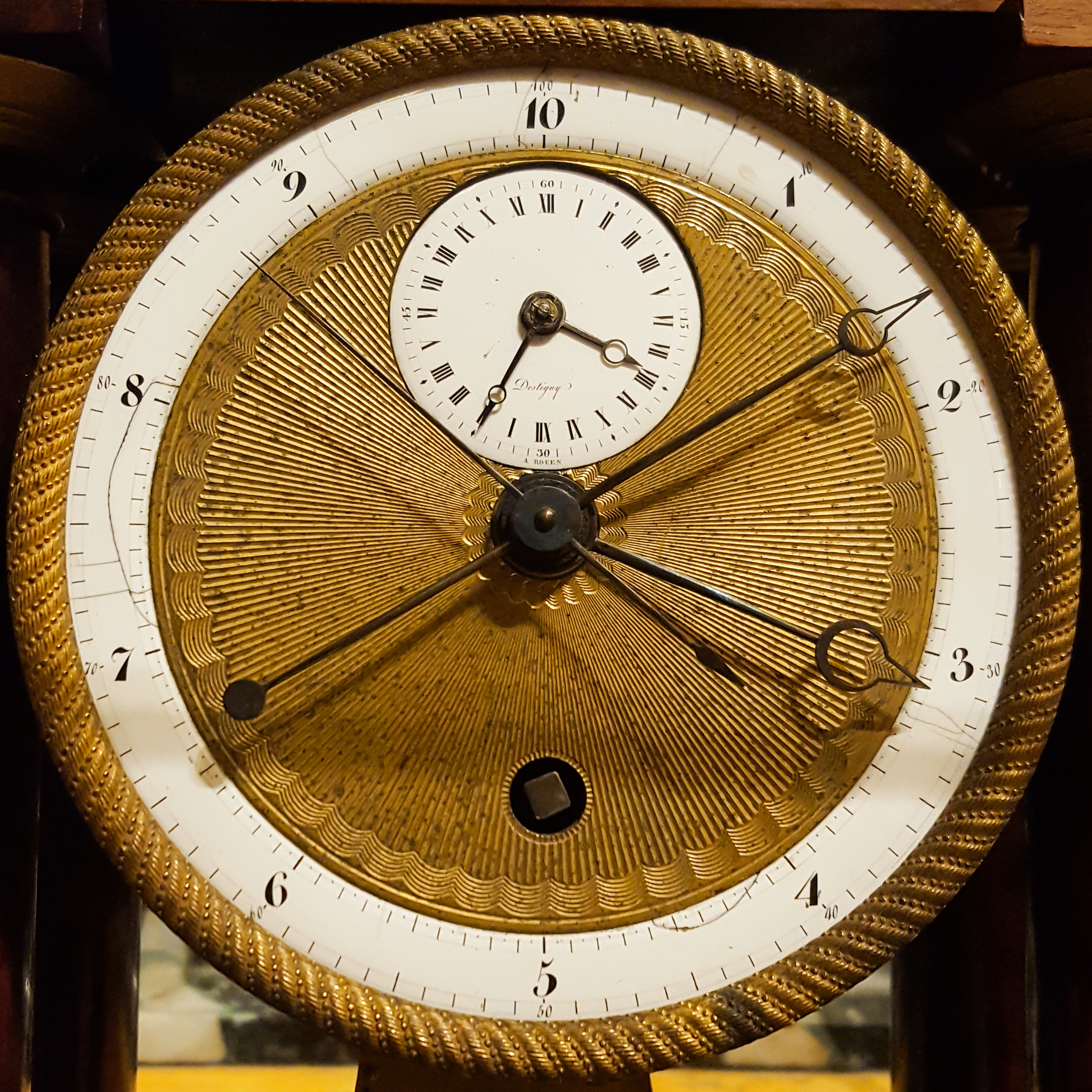
French decimal clock from the time of the French Revolution. The large dial shows the ten hours of the decimal day in Arabic numerals, while the small dial shows the two 12-hour periods of the standard 24-hour day in Roman numerals.

Decimal time is the representation of the time of day using units which are decimally related. This term is often used specifically to refer to the French Republican calendar time system used from 1794 to 1800, during the French Revolution, which divided the day into 10 decimal hours, each decimal hour into 100 decimal minutes and each decimal minute into 100 decimal seconds (100,000 decimal seconds per day), as opposed to the more familiar standard time, which divides the day into 24 hours, each hour into 60 minutes and each minute into 60 seconds (86,400 SI seconds per day).

The main advantage of a decimal time system is that, since the base used to divide the time is the same as the one used to represent it, the representation of hours, minutes and seconds can be handled as a unified value. Therefore, it becomes simpler to interpret a timestamp and to perform conversions. For instance, 1^{h}23^{m}45^{s} is 1 decimal hour, 23 decimal minutes, and 45 decimal seconds, or 1.2345 decimal hours, or 123.45 decimal minutes or 12345 decimal seconds; 3 hours is 300 minutes or 30,000 seconds. This property also makes it straightforward to represent a timestamp as a fractional day, so that 2026-07-28.54321 can be interpreted as five decimal hours, 43 decimal minutes and 21 decimal seconds after the start of that day, or a fraction of 0.54321 (54.321%) through that day (which is two duodecimal minutes and 13 duodecimal seconds after traditional 13:00). It also adjusts well to digital time representation using epochs, in that the internal time representation can be used directly both for computation and for user-facing display.

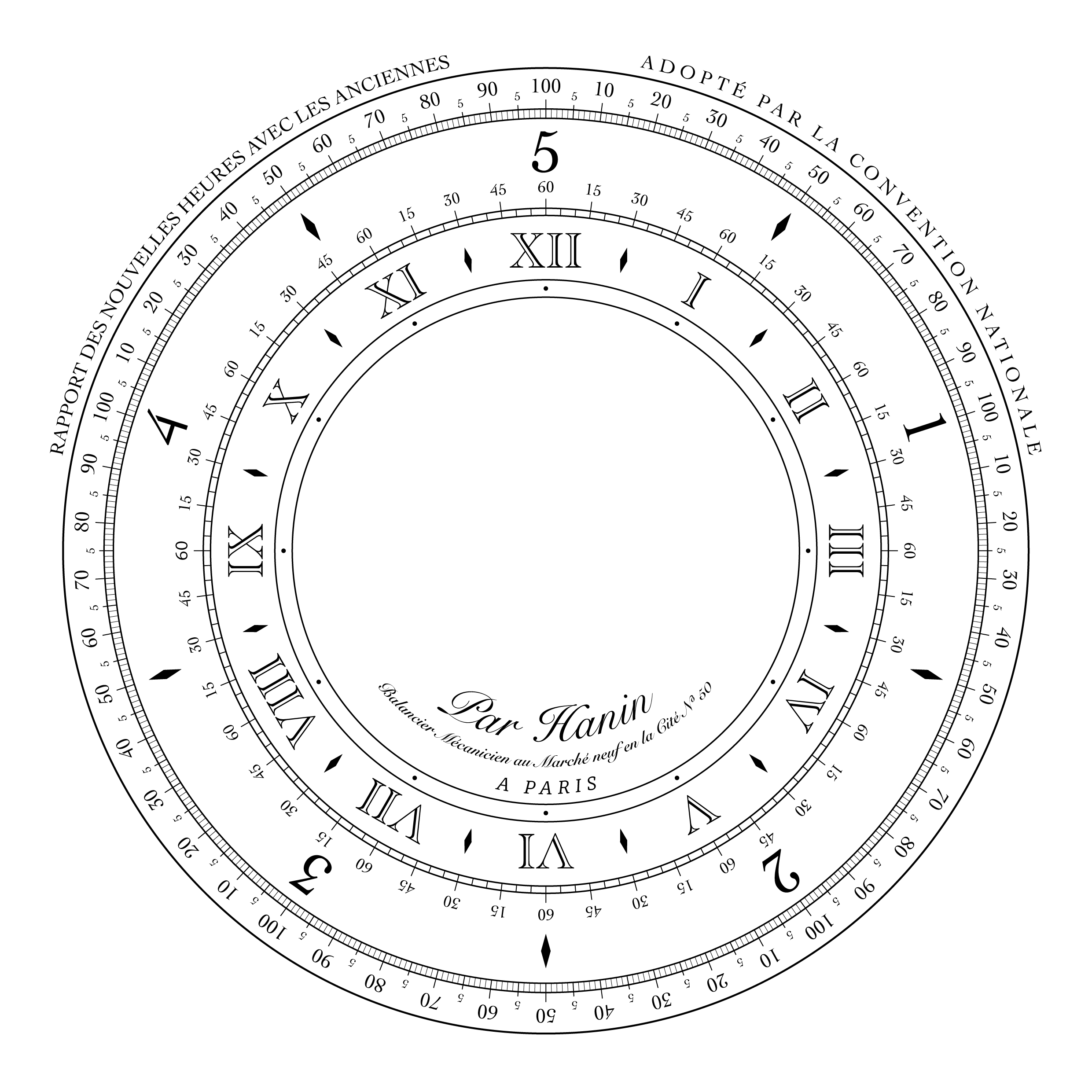
Paper dial to convert a 12-hour clock face to decimal time, presented to the Revolutionary Committee of Public Instruction by Hanin.

decimal	24-hour	12-hour
0:00	00:00	12:00 a.m.
1:00	02:24	2:24 a.m.
2:00	04:48	4:48 a.m.
3:00	07:12	7:12 a.m.
4:00	09:36	9:36 a.m.
5:00	12:00	12:00 p.m.
6:00	14:24	2:24 p.m.
7:00	16:48	4:48 p.m.
8:00	19:12	7:12 p.m.
9:00	21:36	9:36 p.m.

== History ==
=== Egypt ===
The decans are 36 groups of stars (small constellations) used in the ancient Egyptian astronomy to conveniently divide the 360 degree ecliptic into 36 parts of 10 degrees. Because a new decan also appears heliacally every ten days (that is, every ten days, a new decanic star group reappears in the eastern sky at dawn right before the Sun rises, after a period of being obscured by the Sun's light), the ancient Greeks called them dekanoi (δεκανοί; pl. of δεκανός dekanos) or "tens". A ten-day period between the rising of two consecutive decans is a decade. There were 36 decades (36 × 10 = 360 days), plus five added days to compose the 365 days of a solar based year.

=== China ===
Decimal time was used in China throughout most of its history alongside duodecimal time. The midnight-to-midnight day was divided both into 12 double hours (traditional Chinese: 時辰; simplified Chinese: 时辰; pinyin: shí chén) and also into 10 shi / 100 ke (Chinese: 刻; pinyin: kè) by the 1st millennium BC. Other numbers of ke per day were used during three short periods: 120 ke from 5 to 3 BC, 96 ke from AD 507 to 544, and 108 ke from 544 to 565. Several of the roughly 50 Chinese calendars also divided each ke into 100 fen, although others divided each ke into 60 fen. In 1280, the Shoushi (Season Granting) calendar further subdivided each fen into 100 miao, creating a complete decimal time system of 100 ke, 100 fen and 100 miao. Chinese decimal time ceased to be used in 1645 when the Shíxiàn calendar, based on European astronomy and brought to China by the Jesuits, adopted 96 ke per day alongside 12 double hours, making each ke exactly one-quarter hour.

Gēng (更) is a time signal given by drum or gong. The character for gēng 更, literally meaning "rotation" or "watch", comes from the rotation of watchmen sounding these signals. The first gēng theoretically comes at sundown, but was standardized to fall at 19:12. The time between each gēng is 1/10 of a day, making a gēng 2.4 hours long (2 hours 24 minutes). As a 10-part system, the gēng are strongly associated with the 10 celestial stems, especially since the stems are used to count off the gēng during the night in Chinese literature.

As early as the Bronze-Age Xia dynasty, days were grouped into ten-day weeks known as xún (旬). Months consisted of three xún. The first 10 days were the early xún (上旬), the middle 10 the mid xún (中旬), and the last nine or 10 days were the late xún (下旬). Japan adopted this pattern, with 10-day-weeks known as jun (旬). In Korea, they were known as sun (순,旬).

=== France ===
==== Pre-Revolution ====
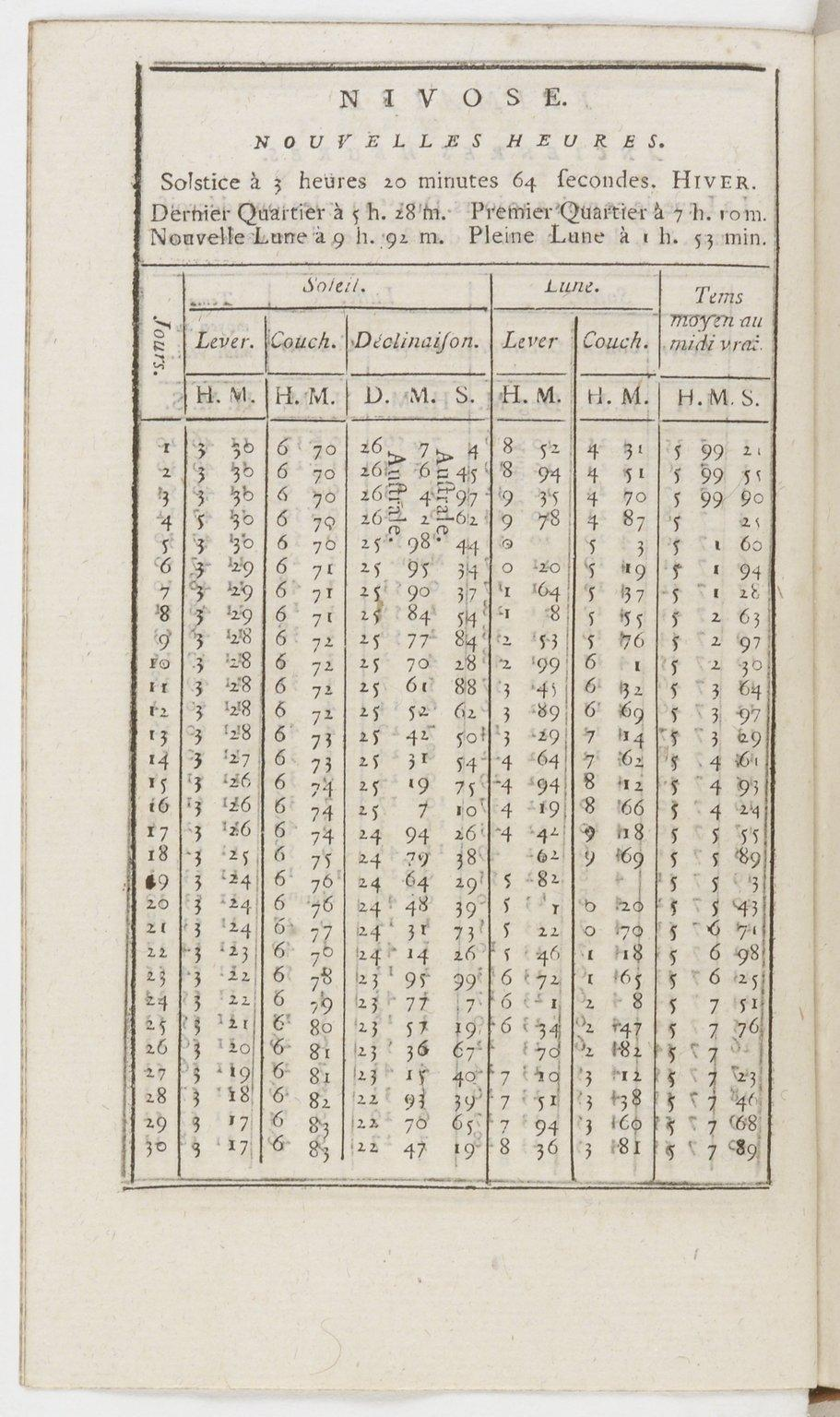
Astronomical table from the Almanach national de France using decimal time

In 1754, Jean le Rond d'Alembert wrote in the Encyclopédie:

It would be very desirable that all divisions, for example of the livre, the sou, the toise, the day, the hour, etc. would be from tens into tens. This division would result in much easier and more convenient calculations and would be very preferable to the arbitrary division of the livre into twenty sous, of the sou into twelve deniers, of the day into twenty-four hours, the hour into sixty minutes, etc.

In 1788, Claude Boniface Collignon proposed dividing the day into 10 hours or 1,000 minutes, each new hour into 100 minutes, each new minute into 1,000 seconds, and each new second into 1,000 tierces (older French for "third"). The distance the twilight zone travels in one such tierce at the equator, which would be one-billionth of the circumference of the earth, would be a new unit of length, provisionally called a half-handbreadth, equal to four modern centimetres. Further, the new tierce would be divided into 1,000 quatierces, which he called "microscopic points of time". He also suggested a week of 10 days and dividing the year into 10 "solar months".

==== French Republic ====
Decimal time was officially introduced during the French Revolution. Jean-Charles de Borda made a proposal for decimal time on 5 November 1792. The National Convention issued a decree on 5 October 1793, to which the underlined words were added on 24 November 1793 (4 Frimaire of the Year II):

VIII. Each month is divided into three equal parts, of ten days each, which are called décades...
XI. The day, from midnight to midnight, is divided into ten parts or hours, each part into ten others, so on until the smallest measurable portion of the duration. The hundredth part of the hour is called decimal minute; the hundredth part of the minute is called decimal second. This article will not be required for the public records, until from the 1st of Vendémiaire, the year three of the Republic. (September 22, 1794) (emphasis in original)

Thus, midnight was called dix heures ("ten hours"), noon was called cinq heures ("five hours"), etc.

==== Representation ====
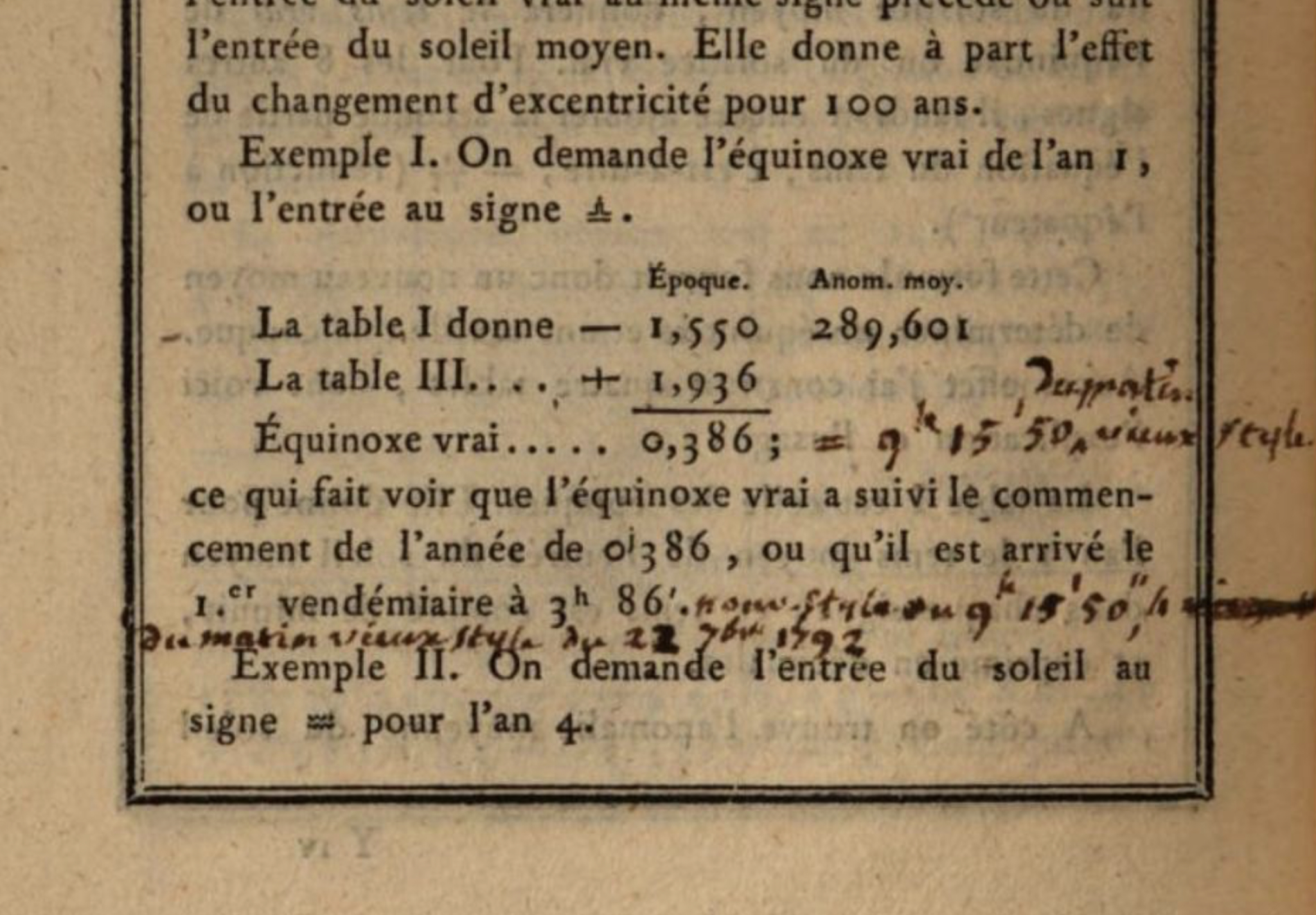
3 different representations of 3 hours 86 minutes decimal time by Delambre (9:15:50 a.m.)

The colon (:) was not yet in use as a unit separator for standard times, and is used for non-decimal bases. The French decimal separator is the comma (,), while the period (.), or "point", is used in English. Units were either written out in full, or abbreviated. Thus, five hours eighty three minutes decimal might be written as 5 h. 83 m. Even today, "h" is commonly used in France to separate hours and minutes of 24-hour time, instead of a colon, such as 14h00. Midnight was represented in civil records as "ten hours". Times between midnight and the first decimal hour were written without hours, so 1:00 am, or 0.41 decimal hours, was written as "four décimes" or "forty-one minutes". 2:00 am (0.8333) was written as "eight décimes", "eighty-three minutes", or even "eighty-three minutes thirty-three seconds".

As with duodecimal time, decimal time was represented according to true solar time, rather than mean time, with noon being marked when the sun reached its highest point locally, which varied at different locations, and throughout the year.

In "Methods to find the Leap Years of the French Calendar", Jean-Baptiste-Joseph Delambre used three different representations for the same decimal time:

- 0,386 (comma is the decimal sign in French)
- 0^{j}386 ("j" is for jour, day in French)
- 3^{h} 86' (apostrophe is for minutes)

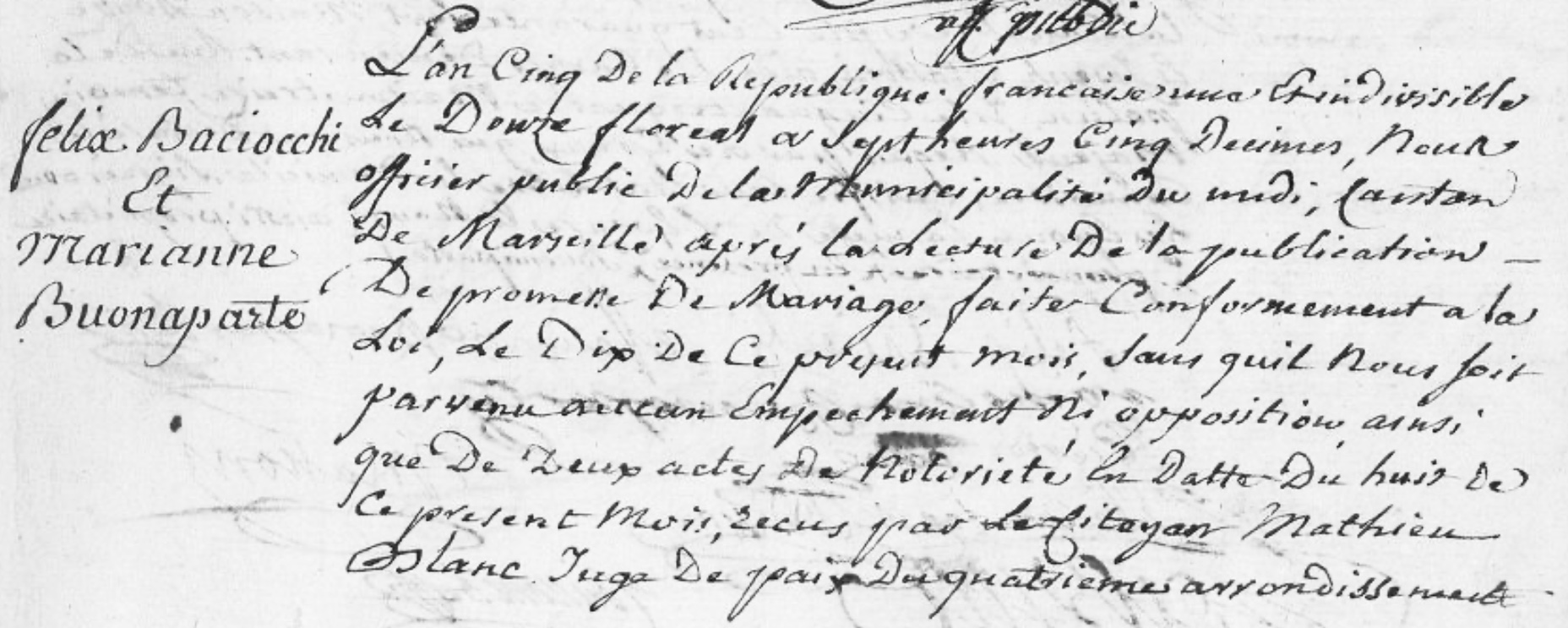
Marriage certificate for Napoleon's sister, dated 12 floreal l'An V "à Sept heures Cinq Decimes" (May 1, 1797, at 6:00 pm).

Sometimes in official records, decimal hours were divided into tenths, or décimes, instead of minutes. One décime is equal to 10 decimal minutes, which is nearly equal to a quarter-hour (15 minutes) in standard time. Thus, "five hours two décimes" equals 5.2 decimal hours, roughly 12:30 p.m. in standard time. One hundredth of a decimal second was a decimal tierce.

==== Usage ====
Although clocks and watches were produced with faces showing both standard time with numbers 1–24 and decimal time with numbers 1–10, decimal time never caught on; it was not used for public records until the beginning of the Republican year III, 22 September 1794, and mandatory use was suspended 7 April 1795 (18 Germinal of the Year III). In spite of this, decimal time was used in many cities, including Marseille and Toulouse, where a decimal clock with just an hour hand was on the front of the Capitole for five years. In some places, decimal time was used to record certificates of births, marriages, and deaths until the end of Year VIII (September 1800). On the Palace of the Tuileries in Paris, two of the four clock faces displayed decimal time until at least 1801. The mathematician and astronomer Pierre-Simon Laplace had a decimal watch made for him, and used decimal time in his work, in the form of fractional days.

Decimal time was part of a larger attempt at decimalisation in revolutionary France (which also included decimalisation of currency and metrication) and was introduced as part of the French Republican Calendar, which, in addition to decimally dividing the day, divided the month into three décades of 10 days each; this calendar was abolished at the end of 1805. The start of each year was determined according to the day of the autumnal equinox, in relation to true or apparent solar time at the Paris Observatory.

==== Metric system ====
In designing the new metric system, the intent was to replace all the various units of different bases with a small number of standard decimal units. This was to include units for length, weight, area, liquid capacity, volume, and money. Initially the traditional second of time equal to 1/86400 day was proposed as the base of the metric system, but this was changed in 1791 to base the meter on a decimal division of a measurement of the Earth, instead. Early drafts of the metric system published in 1793 included the new decimal divisions of the day included with the Republican calendar, and some of the same individuals were involved with both projects.

On March 28, 1794, Joseph-Louis Lagrange proposed to the Commission for Republican Weights and Measures on dividing the day into 10 decidays and 100 centidays, which would be expressed together as two digits, counting periods of 14 minutes and 24 seconds since midnight, nearly a quarter hour. This would be displayed by one hand on watches. Another hand would display 100 divisions of a centiday, which is 1/10,000 day, or 8.64 seconds. A third hand on a smaller dial would further divide these into 10, which would be 1/100,000 day, or 864 milliseconds, slightly less than a whole second. He suggested the deciday and centiday be used together to represent the time of day, such as "4 and 5", "4/5", or simply "45".

This was opposed by Jean-Marie Viallon, of the Sainte-Geneviève Library in Paris, who thought that decimal hours, equal to 2.4 old hours, were too long, and that 100 centidays were too many, and proposed dividing two halves of the day into 10 new hours each, for a total of 20 per day, and that simply changing the numbers on watch dials from 12 to 10, he thought, would be sufficient for rural people. For others, there would be 50 decimal minutes per decimal hour, and 100 decimal seconds per decimal minute. His new hours, minutes, and seconds would thus be more similar to the old units.

C.A. Prieur (of the Côte-d'Or), read at the National Convention on Ventôse 11, year III (March 1, 1795):

1) As it does not offer almost all of the nation any marked advantage, it would only throw a disadvantage on the new system of measures and the decimal method, which is however very useful;
2) Since the hourly compilation is not a commercial object or susceptible to a police regulation, the old uses would be maintained by the immense force of habit;
3) This habit would be further consolidated by the fear of confusion. It would be necessary, to prevent it, to take new names that have not yet been indicated, and that it would be very difficult to introduce into common language, especially for so many people who do not write, who do not calculate, and who appreciate time only by a routine based on common opinion;
4) The expense of changing the clocks would be enormous;
5) Finally, citizens and watchmakers would be infinitely dismayed, some to change their watches, others to lose the ability to sell those that are already made. This truth is acquired by the result of the contest which took place recently, under the decree on watchmaking movements.
But by asking that the decimal division of the day is not a condition of rigor, there is no disagreement that there are several circumstances where it has advantages. We know that in several objects of the Navy service, in astronomical or trigonometric calculations, and for delicate experiments, the decimal division of time is more convenient. It will therefore be good to reserve it for these cases, until the use can spread more generally, which will happen by itself imperceptibly.

Thus, the law of 18 Germinal An III (April 7, 1795) establishing the metric system, rather than including metric units for time, repealed the mandatory use of decimal time, although its use continued for a number of years in some places. As predicted, it was quickly found to be useful by astronomers, who still use it in the form of fractional days.

Carl Friedrich Gauss recommended the ephemeris second as a metric base unit for time interval in 1832, which eventually became the atomic second in the International System. However, for longer periods of time interval, the old non-decimal units were approved for use.

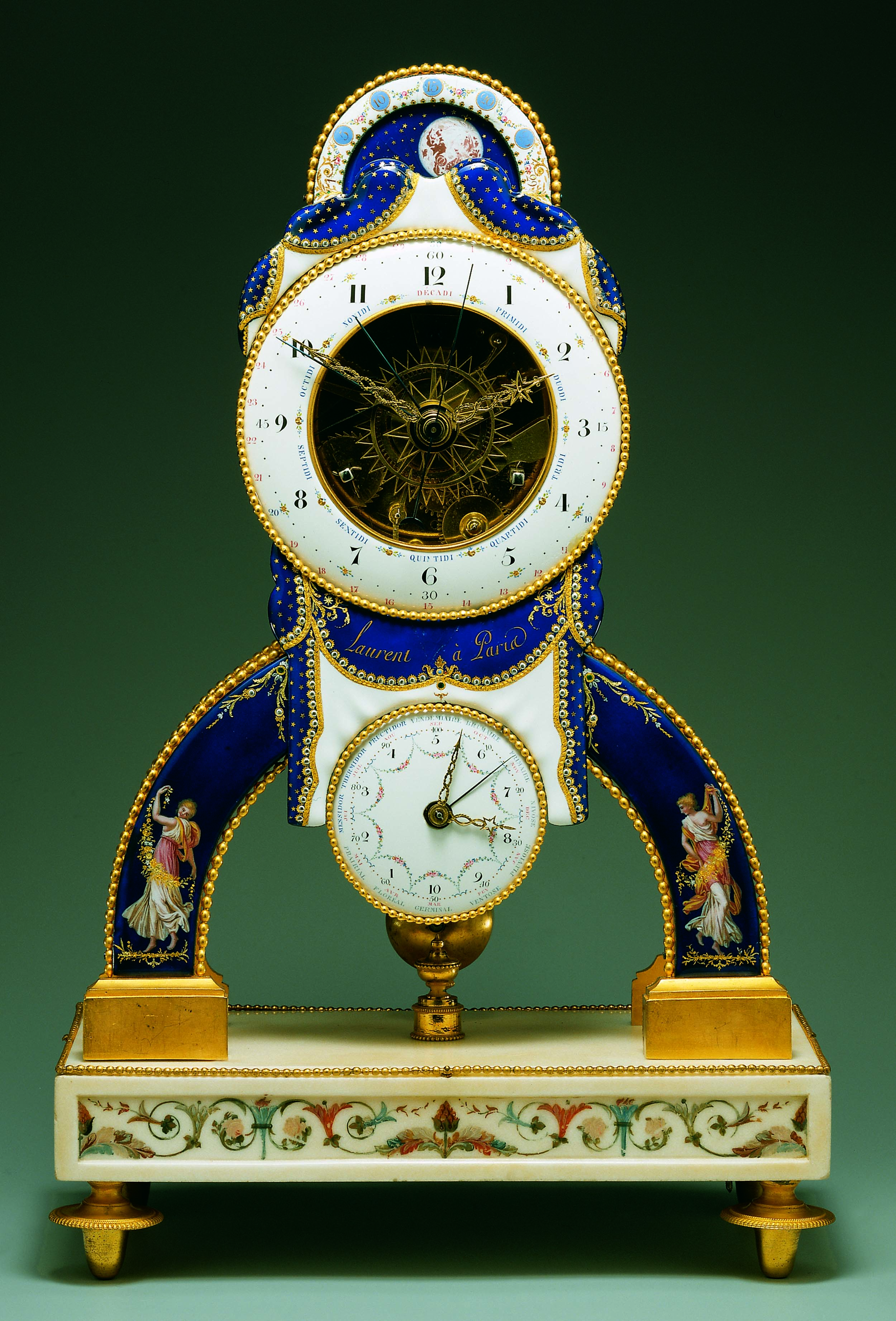
French timepiece with 12-hour (upper) and decimal (lower) faces, 1793–94

==== Later proposals ====
At the International Meridian Conference of 1884, the following resolution was proposed by the French delegation and passed nem con (with 3 abstentions):

VII. That the Conference expresses the hope that the technical studies designed to regulate and extend the application of the decimal system to the division of angular space and of time shall be resumed, so as to permit the extension of this application to all cases in which it presents real advantages.

In the 1890s, Joseph Charles François de Rey-Pailhade, president of the Toulouse Geographical Society, proposed dividing the day into 100 parts, called cés, equal to 14.4 standard minutes, and each divided into 10 decicés, 100 centicés, etc. The Toulouse Chamber of Commerce adopted a resolution supporting his proposal in April 1897. Although widely published, the proposal received little backing.

The French made another attempt at the decimalization of time in 1897, when the Commission de décimalisation du temps was created by the Bureau des Longitudes, with the mathematician Henri Poincaré as secretary. The commission adopted a compromise, originally proposed by Henri de Sarrauton of the Oran Geographical Society, of retaining the 24-hour day, but dividing each hour into 100 decimal minutes, and each minute into 100 seconds. The plan did not gain acceptance and was abandoned in 1900.

=== Swatch Internet Time ===
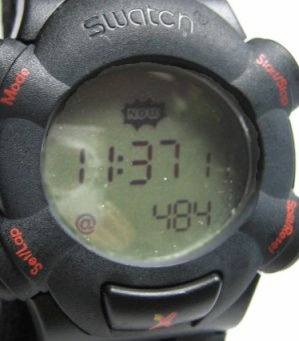
A Swatch watch showing .beat time in the bottom part of the display

On 23 October 1998, the Swiss watch company Swatch introduced a decimal time called Internet Time for its line of digital watches, which divided the day into 1,000 ".beats", (each 86.4 seconds in standard time) counted from 000–999, with @000 being midnight and @500 being noon standard time in Switzerland, which is Central European Time (one hour ahead of Universal Time).

Although Swatch did not specify units smaller than one .beat, third party implementations extended the standard by adding "centibeats" or "sub-beats", for extended precision: @248.00. Each "centibeat" was a hundredth of a .beat and was therefore equal to one French decimal second (0.864 seconds).

When using .beats and centibeats, Swatch Internet Time divided the day into 1,000 French decimal minutes and each decimal minute into 100 decimal seconds. So 9pm was 21:00:00 in standard time and @875.00 in extended Swatch Internet Time.

Swatch no longer markets digital watches with Internet Time.

== Conversions ==
There are exactly 86,400 standard seconds (see SI for the current definition of the standard second) in a standard day, but in the French decimal time system there were 100,000 decimal seconds in the day; thus, the decimal second was 13.6% shorter than its standard counterpart.

Unit	Seconds (SI)	Minutes	Hours	h:mm:ss.sss
1 Decimal second	0.864	0.0144	0.00024	0:00:00.864
1 Decimal minute	86.4	1.44	0.024	0:01:26.400
1 Décime	864	14.4	0.24	0:14:24.000
1 Decimal hour	8,640	144	2.4	2:24:00.000

== Decimal hours ==
Another common type of decimal time is decimal hours. In 1896, Henri de Sarrauton of the Oran Geographical Society proposed dividing the 24 hours of the day each into 100 decimal minutes, and each minute into 100 decimal seconds. Although endorsed by the Bureau des Longitudes, this proposal failed, but using decimal fractions of an hour to represent the time of day instead of minutes has become common.

Decimal hours are frequently used in accounting for payrolls and hourly billing. Time clocks typically record the time of day in tenths or hundredths of an hour. For instance, 08:30 would be recorded as 08.50. This is intended to make accounting easier by eliminating the need to convert between minutes and hours.

For aviation purposes, where it is common to add times in an already complicated environment, time tracking is simplified by recording decimal fractions of hours. For instance, instead of adding 1:36 to 2:36, getting 3:72 and converting it to 4:12, one would add 1.6 to 2.6 and get 4.2 hours.

== Fractional days ==
The time of day is sometimes represented as a decimal fraction of a day in science and computers. Standard 24-hour time is converted into a fractional day by dividing the number of hours elapsed since midnight by 24 to make a decimal fraction. Thus, midnight is 0.0 day, noon is 0.5 d, etc., which can be added to any type of date, including the following, all of which refer to the same moment in time:

- Gregorian dates: 2000 January 1.5
- Two-line elements: 00001.50000000
- Julian dates: 2451545.0
- Excel serial dates: 36526.5

As many decimal places may be used as required for precision, so 0.5 d = 0.500000 d. Fractional days are often calculated in UTC or TT, although Julian Dates use pre-1925 astronomical date/time (each date began at noon = ".0") and Microsoft Excel uses the local time zone of the computer. Using fractional days reduces the number of units in time calculations from four (days, hours, minutes, seconds) to just one (days).

Fractional days are often used by astronomers to record observations, and were expressed in relation to Paris Mean Time by the 18th century French mathematician and astronomer Pierre-Simon Laplace, as in these examples:

... et la distance périhélie, égale à 1,053095; ce qui a donné pour l'instant du passage au périhélie, sept.29^{j},10239, temps moyen compté de minuit à Paris.

Les valeurs précédentes de a, b, h, l, relatives à trois observations, ont donné la distance périhélie égale à 1,053650; et pour l'instant du passage, sept.29^{j},04587; ce qui diffère peu des résultats fondés sur cinq observations.

— Pierre-Simon Laplace, Traité de Mécanique Céleste

Fractional days have been used by astronomers ever since. For instance, the 19th century British astronomer John Herschel gave these examples:

Between Greenwich noon of the 22d and 23d of March, 1829, the 1828th equinoctial year terminates, and the 1829th commences. This happens at 0^{d}·286003, or at 6^{h} 51^{m} 50^{s}·66 Greenwich Mean Time ... For example, at 12^{h} 0^{m} 0^{s} Greenwich Mean Time, or 0^{d}·500000...

— John Herschel, Outlines of Astronomy

Fractional days are commonly used to express epochs of orbital elements. The decimal fraction is usually added to the calendar date or Julian day for natural objects, or to the ordinal date for artificial satellites in two-line elements.

== Decimal multiples and fractions of the second ==
The second is the International System of Units (SI) unit of time duration. It is also the standard single-unit time representation in many programming languages, most notably C, and part of UNIX/POSIX standards used by Linux, Mac OS X, etc.; to convert fractional days to fractional seconds, multiply the number by 86400. Fractional seconds are represented as milliseconds (ms), microseconds (μs) or nanoseconds (ns). Absolute times are usually represented relative to 1 January 1970, at midnight UT. Other systems may use a different zero point (like Unix time).

In principle, time spans greater than one second may be given in units such as kiloseconds (ks), megaseconds (Ms), gigaseconds (Gs), and so on. Occasionally, these units can be found in technical literature, but traditional units like minutes, hours, days and years are much more common.

It is possible to specify the time of day as the number of kiloseconds of elapsed time since midnight. Thus, instead of saying 3:45 p.m. one could say (time of day) 56.7 ks. There are exactly 86.4 ks in one day (each kilosecond being equivalent to 16 minutes and 40 seconds worth of conventional time). However, this nomenclature is rarely used in practice.

== Scientific decimal time ==
Scientists often record time as decimal. For example, decimal days divide the day into 10 equal parts, and decimal years divide the year into 10 equal parts. Decimals are easier to plot than both (a) minutes and seconds, which uses the sexagesimal numbering system, (b) hours, months and days, which has irregular month lengths. In astronomy, the so-called Julian day uses decimal days centered on Greenwich noon.

Seconds in a decimal minute

Since there are 60 seconds in a minute, a tenth part represents 60/10 = 6 seconds.

Conversion between decimal minutes and seconds
Decimal minutes	0.1	0.2	0.3	0.4	0.5	0.6	0.7	0.8	0.9	1.0
Second	6^{s}	12^{s}	18^{s}	24^{s}	30^{s}	36^{s}	42^{s}	48^{s}	54^{s}	60^{s}

Minutes in a decimal hour

Since there are 60 minutes in an hour, a tenth part represents 60/10 = 6 minutes.

Conversion between decimal hours and minutes
Decimal hours	0.1	0.2	0.3	0.4	0.5	0.6	0.7	0.8	0.9	1.0
Minutes	6^{m}	12^{m}	18^{m}	24^{m}	30^{m}	36^{m}	42^{m}	48^{m}	54^{m}	60^{m}

Hours in a decimal day

Since there are 24 hours in a day, a tenth part represents 24/10 = 2.4 hours (2 hours and 24 minutes).

Conversion between decimal day and hours/minutes
Decimal days	0.1	0.2	0.3	0.4	0.5	0.6	0.7	0.8	0.9	1.0
Hours/minutes	2^{h} 24^{m}	4^{h} 48^{m}	7^{h} 12^{m}	9^{h} 36^{m}	12^{h}	14^{h} 24^{m}	16^{h} 48^{m}	19^{h} 12^{m}	21^{h} 36^{m}	24^{h}

Length of a decimal year

Since there are about 365 days in a year, there are about 365/10 = 36.5 days in a tenth of a year. Hence the year 2020.5 represents the day 2 July 2020. More exactly, a "Julian year" is approximately 365.25 days long, so a tenth of the year is 36.525 days (36 days, 12 hours, 36 minutes).

Conversion between decimal years and date (in a common year)
Decimal years	0.0	0.1	0.2	0.3	0.4	0.5	0.6	0.7	0.8	0.9	1.0
Days	0	36.525	73.050	109.575	146.100	182.625	219.150	255.675	292.200	328.725	365.250
Date Time	1 Jan; 00:00	6 Feb; 12:36	15 Mar; 01:12	20 Apr; 13:48	27 May; 2:24	1 Jul; 15:00	8 Aug; 03:36	13 Sep; 16:12	20 Oct; 04:48	25 Nov; 17:24	1 Jan; 06:00

These values, based on the Julian year, are most likely to be those used in astronomy and related sciences. A Gregorian year, which takes into account the 100 vs. 400 leap year exception rule of the Gregorian calendar, is 365.2425 days (the average length of a year over a 400–year cycle), resulting in 0.1 years being a period of 36.52425 days (3155695.2 seconds; 36 days, 12 hours, 34 minutes, 55.2 seconds).

== Other decimal times ==
Many people have proposed variations of decimal time, dividing the day into different numbers of units and subunits with different names. Most are based upon fractional days, so that one decimal time format may be easily converted into another, such that all the following are equivalent:

- 0.500 day
- 5 heures décimales
- @500 .beats Swatch Internet Time (see above)
- 50.0 kes or cés (centidays)
- 500 millidays
- 50.0% time as a percentage of the day
- 12:00 standard time

Some decimal time proposals are based upon alternate units of metric time. The difference between metric time and decimal time is that metric time defines units for measuring time interval, as measured with a stopwatch, and decimal time defines the time of day, as measured by a clock. Just as standard time uses the metric time unit of the second as its basis, proposed decimal time scales may use alternative metric units.

In the fictional Star Trek universe, each stardate increment represents one milliyear, with 78 years in 2401, counted from 2323. The decimal represents a fractional day. Thus, stardates are a composition of two types of decimal time. In 2023, 78 years earlier would be 1945.

== See also ==
- 12-hour clock
- 24-hour clock
- Centesimal minute and second of arc
- Decimal calendar
- Hexadecimal time
- List of unusual units of measurement
- Metric time
- Stardate
- Unix time
