= Jeffrey M. Jaffe =

Jeffrey M. Jaffe (born 21 July 1954) is a computer science researcher, who also served as an executive in several companies/non-public organizations across multiple industries, including computing systems, telecommunications, software, and web.

He is perhaps best known for his long-term leadership (2010-2022) of the World Wide Web Consortium (W3C), the main international standards organization for the World Wide Web. He was named one of the Most Influential People in IT of 2011by Tom's Hardware.

He was inducted as an IEEE Fellow for contributions to routing and flow control in computer networks and as an ACM Fellow for outstanding achievements in the development of effective and influential distributed routing algorithms for peer networking and for many professional contributions to computer communication research.

After retiring from the business world he began investigating religious philosophy and is the author of several books incorporating a new approach to the text of the Hebrew Bible.

== Education ==
Jaffe received a BS in Mathematics (1976), MS in Electrical Engineering and Computer Science (1977) and PhD in Computer Science (1979), all from the Massachusetts Institute of Technology. His doctoral thesis was on the topic Parallel Computations: Scheduling, Synchronization, and Schemes. His doctoral advisor was Albert R. Meyer.

== Career ==
=== IBM ===
During the 1980s, Jaffe worked in research at IBM's TJ Watson Research Center, focusing on parallel and distributed algorithms. He published more than 30 papers. Among the most well known papers published at that time were his work with Frank Moss on efficient decentralized routing algorithms, his work with Israel Cidon and Moshe Sidi on distributed deadlock resolution, and his work on bottleneck flow control. The latter was reprinted by the IEEE in a book highlighting the 50 most important papers in 50 years of Communications and Networking Research.

In August 1993 he was appointed as the VP of IBM Research where he was responsible for all Systems and Software Research across all of IBM's research facilities. In June 1996 he became Corporate Vice President of Technology, a position advising the corporation on the adequacy of IBM's technology portfolio and exploring emerging technologies that could either represent new business opportunities, or pose risks to existing businesses. In 1998 he was appointed General Manager of IBM's SecureWay, its security and networking software product line.

=== Lucent/Bell Labs ===
After the breakup of AT&T, Bell Labs was spun off to Lucent. In the competitive telecom environment of the late 1990s, it was no longer practical to maintain Bell Labs' exclusive focus on fundamental science and Jaffe was recruited to lead research efforts that would align fundamental research with business goals. Bell Labs' research budget had been reduced to about $115 million compared to $350 million in the 1990s. Jaffe served as President of Bell Labs Research and Advanced Technologies from 2001-2005 as they worked on improving security and wireless services in particular in television, telephones and internet.

The industry-wide "telecoms crash" in 2001, which resulted in the collapse of many firms defined Jaffe's role: to make Bell Labs affordable in the face of a major financial downturn. Jaffe secured alternative funding for research, by increasing federal research funding from agencies such as DARPA and NSF. Jaffe also worked with New Jersey Governor Jim McGreevey to create a unique public/private partnership called the New Jersey Nanotechnology Consortium. He also expanded Bell Labs international operations: in 2004, they opened a Bell Labs research center in Ireland and in 2005 they opened one in India.

=== Novell ===
In 2005, Jaffe moved from telecom to software when he became the Executive Vice President and CTO of Novell, Inc. In those roles he was responsible for both the technical direction of the company and all business units.

A major focus was the development of open source software. Among of Novell's four business units was Suse Linux – the second largest commercial Linux distribution. Jaffe led negotiations that resulted in a Novell partnership with Microsoft, a portion of which included Microsoft agreeing to be a re-distributor of Suse Linux.

=== World Wide Web Consortium ===
In 2010, Tim Berners-Lee, inventor of the World Wide Web and Director of the World Wide Web Consortium (W3C), recruited Jaffe as CEO. In this Web community leadership position, Jaffe set out to broaden the scope, mission, and impact of the main international standards organization for the World Wide Web. Jaffe's goal was to strengthen the World Wide Web by introducing new technologies, in particular, security.

Some of the steps that Jaffe took to grow the W3C community included:

- Innovation as a precursor to standardization. In 2011 Jaffe (working with Ian Jacobs) helped make it easier for the global Web developer community to bring innovations to W3C and nurture them within a new agile platform called Community Groups. By 2022 there were over 15,000 developers that worked in 350 groups involved in cross-community innovation.
- Recognizing the importance of China as a source of web developer expertise. In 2013, Jaffe further globalized W3C by adding a host in China.
- Addressing web technology needs in diverse industries (e.g. entertainment, telecommunications, fintech, and publishing), Jaffe broadened W3C's efforts. Illustrations of this success in the entertainment industry, are the three technical Emmy awards won by W3C. In 2016 W3C was awarded an Emmy for Accessibility of Video Captioning and Subtitles. In 2019 W3C won the Emmy for streaming a Full TV experience on the web. In 2022 W3C won the Emmy for standardizing font technology.

As a result of these efforts many additional participants, from industry, research, government, and citizens groups around the world joined the organization. Among them, the Wikimedia Foundation joined in 2019.

Jaffe stepped down as CEO of W3C in 2022.

== Public policy roles ==
Through his industry leadership roles Jaffe became involved with various national public policy initiatives.

In 1996, he was appointed by President Clinton to the Advisory Committee for the Presidential Council for Critical Infrastructure Protection where he helped design methods to create secure telecommunications networks and combat cyberterrorism. He was also the lead CTO for the CTO Council of the Computer Systems Policy Project, an affiliate of Computer System CEOs who advocate for public policy changes on export control and encryption. He also served on the National Research Council's Computer Science and Telecommunication Board, an arm of the National Academy of Engineering (NAE). When its publication, "The Bridge" was asked to forecast the next 50 years of innovation, Jaffe was invited (together with Judy Brewer) to write about these needs. Imperatives for the Web: Broad Societal Needs was published in its 50th anniversary issue in 2021.

While at Bell Labs, he worked with the Telecommunications Industry Association (TIA), to highlight how, with the breakup of AT&T, a new model was required for telecommunications research funding. At Novell and W3C, he was involved in issues related to open source and patents.

Also, at W3C, he ensured that the web technology would support broad societal needs such as global language needs, accessibility, privacy, and security.

== Religious philosophy activities ==
In the last several years Jaffe has taught and published works in the field of religious philosophy. In Judaism, the Bible proscribes a way of life for Jews, which is based on performing certain good deeds (Mitzvot). Jaffe's approach uses these same traditional sources to explain how Judaism interprets the Bible as a way of life for all of humanity, not just Jews. In addition to teaching he has published two books on Genesis incorporating this approach: "Genesis: A Torah for All Nations" and "Why Abraham? Genesis and the Qualifications of the Chosen People"

== Awards/recognition ==
1976-1979 NSF Fellowship 1976-1979

1988 IEEE Fellow: For contributions to routing and flow control in computer networks.

1996 ACM Fellow: For outstanding achievements in the development of effective and influential distributed routing algorithms for peer networking and for many professional contributions to computer communication research.

== Other positions ==
- Partnership for Critical Infrastructure Security (1998-2000)
- Computer Science and Telecommunications Board of the National Academy of Engineering (1998-2001
- CTO Council of TIA (2004-2005)
- Commercial Sector Board for TechAmerica ITAA (2008-2010)
- Editor, IEEE Transactions on Communications (1986-1992)
- Editor, ACM/IEEE Transactions on Networking (1992-1993)
- IEEE Comsoc Nominations Board (1992-1994)
- General Chair Infocom (1995)

== Books ==
- J. Crow, J.M. Jaffe, and M. Sachs, "Computing System Applications" in Integrated Optoelectronics, by M. Dagenais, R. F. Leheny, and J. Crow, (Academic Press, 1995).
- J. M. Jaffe, "Bottleneck Flow Control"in The Best of the Best: Fifty Years of Communications and Networking Research, edited by William H. Tranter, Desmond P. Taylor, Rodger E. Ziemer, Nicholas F. Maxemchuk, Jon W. Mark, (IEEE Communications Society, John Wiley and Sons, 2007)
- Jeffrey M. Jaffe, Genesis A Torah for All Nations, (Gefen Publishing House, 2021) ISBN 978-965-7023-18-1
- Jeffrey M. Jaffe, Why Abraham? Genesis and the Qualifications of the Chosen People (Gefen Publishing House, 2024) ISBN 9789657801444

== Key peer-reviewed publications ==
- Davis, E., and J. M. Jaffe, "Algorithms for Scheduling Tasks on Unrelated Processors", Journal of the ACM, October 1981. (221 citations)
- Jaffe, J. M., "Bottleneck Flow Control", IEEE Transactions on Communications, Vol. COM-29, No. 7, July, 1981. (654 citations)
- Jaffe, J. M., "Flow Control Power is Non-Decentralizable", IEEE Transactions on Communications, Vol. COM-29, No. 9, September 1981. (104 citations)
- Bharath-Kumar, K., and J. M. Jaffe, "A New Approach to Performance Oriented Flow Control", IEEE Transactions on Communications Special Issue on Flow Control in Computer Networks, April, 1981 (160 citations)
- Jaffe, J. M., and F. H. Moss, "A Responsive Distributed Routing Algorithm for Computer Networks, IEEE Transactions on Communications, Vol. COM-30, No. 7, July 1982, Part II. (251 citations)
- Jaffe, J. M., "Algorithms for Finding Paths with Multiple Constraints", Networks, Vol. 14 (1984), pp 95-116. (658 citations)
- Jaffe, J. M. and M. El-Sayed, "A view of telecommunications network evolution", IEEE Communications Magazine, Vol. 40, No. 12, December 2002, pp 74-81 (101 citations)
- Akplogan, Adiel A., John Curran, Paul Wilson, Russ Housley, Fadi Chehadé, Jari Arkko, Lynn St Amour, R. Echeberrıa, Axel Pawlik, and Jeff Jaffe. "Montevideo statement on the future of Internet cooperation." Montevideo, Uruguay: ICANN, October 7 (2013).
- Housley, R., Mills, S., Jaffe, J., Aboba B., and St. Amour, L., "Affirmation of the Modern Paradigm for Standards", IAB RFC 6852, IETF. January 2013
