= Unit of time =

Measurement unit for time

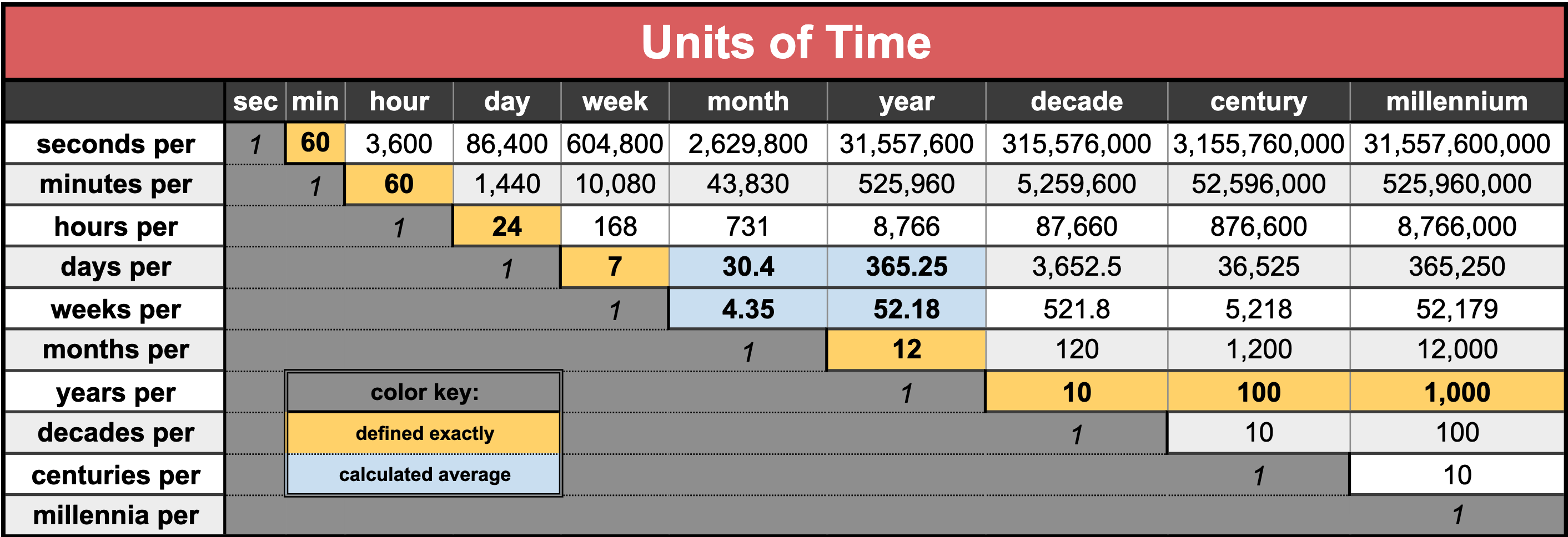
Table showing quantitative relationships between common units of time

A unit of time is any particular duration, used as a unit for measuring time intervals. (Note: Different time intervals may have the same duration: for example, year 2020 and year 2024 both last for one (leap) year.) The second is the base unit of time in the International System of Units (SI), and by extension most of the Western world; it is defined as around 9 billion oscillations of the caesium atom. (Note: The exact modern SI definition is "[The second] is defined by taking the fixed numerical value of the cesium frequency, Δν_{Cs}, the unperturbed ground-state hyper-fine transition frequency of the cesium 133 atom, to be 9192631770 when expressed in the unit Hz, which is equal to s^{−1}.")

Historically, many units of time were defined by the movements of astronomical objects.

- Sun-based: the year is based on the Earth's orbital period around the sun. Historical year-based units include the Olympiad (four years), the lustrum (five years), the indiction (15 years), the decade, the century, and the millennium.
- Moon-based: the month is based on the Moon's orbital period around the Earth.
- Earth-based: the day is based on the time it takes for the Earth to rotate on its own axis, relative to the Sun. Units originally derived from this base include the week (seven days), and the fortnight (14 days). Subdivisions of the day include the hour (1/24 of a day), which is further subdivided into minutes and seconds. The second is the international standard unit (SI unit) for science.
- Celestial sphere-based: as in sidereal time, where the apparent movement of the stars and constellations across the sky is used to calculate the length of a year.

These units do not have a consistent relationship with each other and require intercalation. For example, the year cannot be divided into twelve 28-day months since 12 times 28 is 336, well short of 365. The lunar month (as defined by the moon's rotation) is not 28 days but 28.3 days. The year, defined in the Gregorian calendar as 365.2425 days has to be adjusted with leap days and leap seconds. Consequently, these units are now all defined for scientific purposes as multiples of seconds.

== Historical ==
The natural units for timekeeping used by most historical societies are the day, the solar year and the lunation. Such calendars include the Sumerian, Egyptian, Chinese, Babylonian, ancient Athenian, Buddhist, Hindu, Islamic, Icelandic, Mayan, and French Republican calendars.

The modern calendar has its origins in the Roman calendar, which evolved into the Julian calendar, and then the Gregorian calendar.

Horizontal logarithmic scale marked with units of time in the Gregorian calendar

== Scientific ==
- The Planck time is the time that light takes to travel one Planck length. (5.391 247 × 10⁻⁴⁴ sec., Full Form: 0.000 000 000 000 000 000 000 000 000 000 000 000 000 000 053 912 47 sec.)
- The Jiffy is the amount of time light takes to travel one femtometre (about the diameter of a nucleon).
- The atomic time relates to the orbital period of a ground state electron around a hydrogen atom and is about 24.2 attoseconds.
- The svedberg is a time unit used for sedimentation rates (usually of proteins). It is defined as 10^{−13} seconds (100 fs).
- The TU (for time unit) is a unit of time defined as 1024 μs for use in engineering.
- The galactic year, based on the rotation of the galaxy and usually measured in million years.
- The geological time scale relates stratigraphy to time. The deep time of Earth's past is divided into units according to events that took place in each period. For example, the boundary between the Cretaceous period and the Paleogene period is defined by the Cretaceous–Paleogene extinction event. The largest unit is the supereon, composed of eons. Eons are divided into eras, which are in turn divided into periods, epochs and ages. It is not a true mathematical unit, as all ages, epochs, periods, eras, or eons don't have the same length; instead, their length is determined by the geological and historical events that define them individually. A table with approximate time lengths can be seen at Divisions of geologic time

Note: The light-year is not a unit of time, but a unit of length of about 9.5 petametres (9454254955488 km).

Note: The parsec is not a unit of time, but a unit of length of about 30.9 trillion kilometres, despite movie references otherwise.

== List ==
Units of time
Name	Length	Notes
Planck time	~5.39×10^{−44} s	The amount of time light takes to travel one Planck length.
quectosecond	10^{−30} s	One nonillionth of a second.
rontosecond	10^{−27} s	One octillionth of a second.
yoctosecond	10^{−24} s	One septillionth of a second.
jiffy (physics)	3×10^{−24} s	The amount of time light takes to travel one fermi (about the size of a nucleon) in a vacuum.
zeptosecond	10^{−21} s	One sextillionth of a second. Time measurement scale of the NIST and JILA strontium atomic clock. Smallest fragment of time currently measurable is 247 zeptoseconds.
attosecond	10^{−18} s	One quintillionth of a second.
atomic time	~2.42×10^{−17} s	Derived from atomic theory of hydrogen.
femtosecond	10^{−15} s	One quadrillionth of a second.
svedberg	10^{−13} s	100 femtoseconds, time unit used for sedimentation rates (usually of proteins).
picosecond	10^{−12} s	One trillionth of a second.
nanosecond	10^{−9} s	One billionth of a second. Time for molecules to fluoresce.
shake	10^{−8} s	10 nanoseconds, also a casual term for a short period of time.
microsecond	10^{−6} s	One millionth of a second. Symbol is μs
millisecond	10^{−3} s	One thousandth of a second. Shortest time unit used on stopwatches.
centisecond	10^{−2} s	One hundredth of a second.
jiffy (electronics)	~2×10^{−2} s	Used to measure the time between alternating power cycles.
decisecond	10^{−1} s	One tenth of a second.
second	1 s	SI base unit for time
decasecond	10 s	
minute	60 s	
hectosecond	100 s	1 minute and 40 seconds
milliday	1/1000 d (0.001 d)	1.44 minutes, or 86.4 seconds. Also marketed as a ".beat" by the Swatch corporation.
moment	1/40 solar hour (90 s on average)	Medieval unit of time used by astronomers to compute astronomical movements, length varies with the season. Also colloquially refers to a brief period of time.
centiday	0.01 d (1 % of a day)	14.4 minutes, or 864 seconds. One-hundredth of a day is 1 cd (centiday), also called "kè" in traditional Chinese timekeeping. The unit was also proposed by Lagrange and endorsed by Rey-Pailhade in the 19th century, named "centijours" (from French centi- 'hundred' and jour 'day').
kilosecond	10^{3} s	$16.\overline{6}$ minutes.
hour	60 min	60 minutes
deciday	0.1 d (10 % of a day)	2.4 hours, or 144 minutes. One-tenth of a day is 1 dd (deciday), also called "gēng" in traditional Chinese timekeeping.
day	24 h	The SI day is exactly 86 400 seconds.
week	7 d	Historically sometimes also called "sennight".
decaday	10 d (1 Dd)	10 days. A period of time analogous to the concept of "week", used by different societies around the world: the ancient Egyptian calendar, the ancient Chinese calendar, and also the French Republican calendar (in which it was called a décade).
megasecond	10^{6} s	$11.5\overline{740}$ days.
fortnight	2 weeks	14 days
lunar month	27 d 4 h 48 min – 29 d 12 h	There are several definitions of lunar month
month	28–31 d	Occasionally calculated as 30 days.
hectoday	100 d (1 hd)	100 days, roughly equivalent to 1/4 of a year (91.25 days). In Chinese tradition "bǎi rì" (百日) is the hundredth day after one's birth, also called Baby's 100 Days Celebration.
semester	6 months	A division of the academic year. Literally "six months".
lunar year	354.37 d	12 Lunar months instead of normal months
common year	365 d	52 weeks and 1 d
tropical year	365 d 5 h 48 min 45.216 s	The time it takes for the Sun to return to the same position in the sky relative to the earth or other planetary bodies
Gregorian year	365 or 366 days	
Julian year	365 d 6 h	The Julian year, as used in astronomy and other sciences, is a time unit now defined as exactly 365.25 days of 86400 SI seconds each.
sidereal year	365 d 6 h 9 min 9.7635456 s	The time it takes for the Earth to complete one full revolution around the Sun relative to the background stars
leap year	366 d	52 weeks and 2 d that happens every 4 years where there is an extra day in February to make up the day lost in the Gregorian calendar
olympiad	4 yr	A quadrennium (plural: quadrennia or quadrenniums) is also a period of four years, most commonly used in reference to the four-year period between each Olympic Games. It is also used in reference to the four-year interval between leap years, for example when wishing friends and family a "happy quadrennium" on February 29.
lustrum	5 yr	In early Roman times, the interval between censuses.
decade	10 yr	
indiction	15 yr	Interval for taxation assessments (Roman Empire).
gigasecond	10^{9} s	About 31.71 years.
century	100 yr	
millennium	1000 yr	Also called "kiloannum".
Age	$2148.\overline{6}$ years	A superstitious unit of time used in astrology, each of them representing a star sign.
Great Year	25772 yr	Gradual shift in the orientation of Earth's axis of rotation in a cycle of approximately 26,000 years. At present, the rate of precession corresponds to a period of 25,772 years, so a tropical year is shorter than a sidereal year by 1,224.5 seconds (20 min 24.5 sec ≈ (365.24219 × 86400) / 25772).
terasecond	10^{12} s	About 31 710 years.
megaannum	10^{6} yr	Also called "megayear". 1000 millennia (plural of millennium), or 1 million years (in geology, abbreviated as Ma).
petasecond	10^{15} s	About 31 709 792 years.
Galactic year	2.3×10^{8} yr	The amount of time it takes the Solar System to orbit the center of the Milky Way Galaxy (approx 230000000 years).
cosmological decade	logarithmic (varies)	10 times the length of the previous cosmological decade, with CD 1 beginning either 10 seconds or 10 years after the Big Bang, depending on the definition.
eon	10^{9} yr	Also refers to an indefinite period of time, otherwise is 1000000000 years.
kalpa	4.32×10^{9} yr	Used in Hindu mythology. About 4320000000 years.
exasecond	10^{18} s	About 31 709 791 984 years. Approximately 2.3 times the current age of the universe.

== Interrelation ==
Flowchart illustrating selected units of time. The graphic also shows the three celestial objects that are related to the units of time.

All of the formal units of time are scaled multiples of each other. The most common units are the second, defined in terms of an atomic process; the day, an integral multiple of seconds; and the year, usually 365 days. The other units used are multiples or divisions of these three.

== See also ==
- Unit of frequency
- Orders of magnitude (time)
- List of obsolete units of measurement
