= Interpacket gap =

Pause between sending network packets

In computer networking, the interpacket gap (IPG), also known as interframe spacing, or interframe gap (IFG), is a pause which may be required between network packets or network frames. Depending on the physical layer protocol or encoding used, the pause may be necessary to allow for receiver clock recovery, permitting the receiver to prepare for another packet (e.g. powering up from a low-power state) or another purpose. It may be considered as a specific case of a guard interval.

== Ethernet ==
Ethernet devices must allow a minimum idle period between transmission of Ethernet packets. A brief recovery time between packets allows devices to prepare for reception of the next packet. While some physical layer variants literally transmit nothing during the idle period, most modern ones continue to transmit an idle pattern signal. The standard minimum interpacket gap for transmission is 96 bit times (the time it takes to transmit 96 bits of data on the medium). The time is measured from the end of the frame check sequence of one frame to the start of the preamble for the next.

During data reception, some interpacket gaps may be smaller due to variable network delays, clock tolerances (all speeds), and the presence of repeaters (10 Mbit/s only).

Ethernet IPG
Ethernet variant	Minimum transmitted IPG (96 bit times)	Minimum received IPG
10 Mbit/s Ethernet	9.6 μs	4.7 μs (47 bit times)
100 Mbit/s (Fast) Ethernet	0.96 μs	0.96 μs (96 bit times)
Gigabit Ethernet	96 ns	64 ns (64 bit times)
2.5 Gigabit Ethernet	38.4 ns	16 ns (40 bit times)
5 Gigabit Ethernet	19.2 ns	8 ns (40 bit times)
10 Gigabit Ethernet	9.6 ns	4 ns (40 bit times)
25 Gigabit Ethernet	3.84 ns	1.6 ns (40 bit times)
40 Gigabit Ethernet	2.4 ns	200 ps (8 bit times)
50 Gigabit Ethernet	1.92 ns	160 ps (8 bit times)
100 Gigabit Ethernet	960 ps	80 ps (8 bit times)
200 Gigabit Ethernet	480 ps	40 ps (8 bit times)
400 Gigabit Ethernet	240 ps	20 ps (8 bit times)

Some manufacturers design adapters transmitting with a smaller interpacket gap for slightly higher data transfer rates. That can lead to data loss when mixed with standard adaptors.

== Fibre Channel ==
For Fibre Channel, there is a sequence of primitives between successive frames, sometimes called interframe gap as well. The minimum sequence consists of six primitives, IDLE|IDLE|R_RDY|R_RDY|IDLE|IDLE. Each primitive consists of four channel words of 10 bits each for 8b/10b encoded variants (1–8 Gbit/s), equivalent to four data bytes.
