= SC-FDE =

Single-Carrier Frequency Domain Equalization (SC-FDE) is a single-carrier (SC) modulation combined with frequency-domain equalization (FDE). It is an alternative approach to inter symbol interference (ISI) mitigation.

== See also ==
- Single-carrier FDMA
