= CFO (disambiguation) =

CFO, or chief financial officer, is a high-ranking corporate officer of an organization.

CFO may also refer to:

== Finance ==
- Collateralized fund obligation, a type of financial instrument
- Cash flow from operating activities, a metric in financial accounting
- CFO (magazine), an American trade magazine

== Other job titles ==
- Chief Fire Officer, of a fire brigade
- Chief Firearms Officer, in Canada

== Transportation ==
- Chemin de fer de l'Outaouais, a railroad in Quebec, Canada
- Colorado Air and Space Port, United States (FAA code: CFO)
- Chalfont & Latimer station, England (London Underground code: CFO)

== Other uses ==
- Carrier frequency offset, of radio signals
- Charles Foster Offdensen, a fictional character from Metalocalypse
- Commission on Filipinos Overseas, a Philippine government agency
- CTBC Flying Oyster, a Taiwanese League of Legends team
