= Multiplexing and multiple access =

Multiplexing and multiple access may refer to:

- Multiplexing, a method by which multiple analog or digital signals are combined into one signal over a shared medium
- Multiple access, allows several terminals connected to the same transmission medium to transmit over a shared medium.
