= Minute =

Unit of time equal to 60 seconds

minute
- An analogue clock showing one minute after twelve

General information
- Unit of: time
- Symbol: min

Conversions
1 min in ...	... is equal to ...
- SI units: 60 s
- Non-SI units: 1/60 h

A minute (symbol: min) is a unit of time defined as equal to 60 seconds. The prime symbol ′ is also sometimes used informally to denote minutes.

In the UTC time standard, a minute on rare occasions has 61 seconds, a consequence of leap seconds; there is also a provision to insert a negative leap second, which would result in a 59-second minute, but this has never happened in more than 40 years under this system.

== History ==
Al-Biruni first subdivided the hour sexagesimally into minutes, seconds, thirds and fourths in 1000 CE while discussing Jewish months.

Historically, the word "minute" comes from the Latin pars minuta prima, meaning "first small part". This division of the hour can be further refined with a "second small part" (Latin: pars minuta secunda), and this is where the word "second" comes from. For even further refinement, the term "third" (1/60 of a second) was once used, but most modern usage subdivides seconds by using decimals. The symbol notation of the prime for minutes and double prime for seconds can be seen as indicating the first and second cut of the hour (similar to how the foot is the first cut of the yard or perhaps chain, with inches as the second cut). In 1267, the medieval scientist Roger Bacon, writing in Latin, defined the division of time between full moons as a number of hours, minutes, seconds, thirds, and fourths (horae, minuta, secunda, tertia, and quarta) after noon on specified calendar dates. Jost Bürgi was the first clock maker to include a minute hand on a clock for astronomer Tycho Brahe in 1577. The introduction of the minute hand into watches was possible only after the invention of the hairspring by Thomas Tompion, an English watchmaker, in 1675.

== See also ==
- Clock face
- International System of Units
- Latitude and longitude
- Orders of magnitude (time)

== Bibliography ==
- Henry Campbell Black, Black's Law Dictionary, 6th Edition, entry on Minute. West Publishing Company, St. Paul, Minnesota, 1991.
