= Jiffy (time) =

Measurement of time

Jiffy can be an informal term for any unspecified short period, as in "I will be back in a jiffy". From this, it has acquired a number of more precise applications as the name of multiple units of measurement, each used to express or measure very brief durations of time. First attested in 1780, the word's origin is unclear, though one suggestion is that it was thieves' cant for lightning. It was common in a number of Scots English dialects and in John Jamieson's Etymological Dictionary of the Scottish Language (1808) it is suggested that it is a corruption of 'gliff' (glimpse) or 'gliffin' (glance) (compare: 'in the blink of an eye') and may ultimately derive from Gothic or Teutonic words for 'shine'. ('Gliff' or 'gliss' for 'a transient view' was also found in older English poetry as early as 1738.)

== Beginnings in measurement ==
The earliest technical usage for jiffy was defined by Gilbert Newton Lewis (1875–1946). He proposed in 1926 a unit of time called the "jiffy" which was equal to the time it takes light to travel one centimeter in vacuum (approximately 33.3564 picoseconds). It has since been redefined for different measurements depending on the field of study.

== Uses ==
=== Electronics ===
In electronics, a jiffy is the period of an alternating current power cycle, 1/60 or 1/50 of a second in most mains power supplies.

=== Computing ===
In computing, a jiffy was originally the time between two ticks of the system timer interrupt. It is not an absolute time interval unit, since its duration depends on the clock interrupt frequency of the particular hardware platform.

Many older game consoles (which use televisions as a display device) commonly synchronize the system interrupt timer with the vertical frequency of the local television standard, either 59.94 Hz with NTSC systems, or 50.0 Hz (20 ms) with most PAL systems.

Some 1980s 8-bit Commodore computers, such as the PET / VIC-20 / C64, had a jiffy of 1/60 second, which was not dependent on the mains AC or video vertical refresh rate. A timer in the computer creates the 60 Hz rate, causing an interrupt service routine to be executed every 1/60 second, incrementing a 24-bit jiffy counter, scanning the keyboard, and handling some other housekeeping.

Jiffy values for various Linux versions and platforms have typically varied between about 1 ms and 10 ms, with 10 ms (1/100 s) reported as an increasingly common standard in the Jargon File.

Stratus VOS (Virtual Operating System) uses a jiffy of 1/65,536 second to express date and time (number of jiffies elapsed since 1 January 1980 00:00 Greenwich Mean Time). Stratus also defines the microjiffy, being 1/65,536 of a regular jiffy.

The term jiffy is sometimes used in computer animation as a method of defining playback rate, with the delay interval between individual frames specified in 1/100 of a second (10 ms) jiffies, particularly in Autodesk Animator .FLI sequences (one global frame frequency setting) and animated Compuserve .GIF images (each frame having an individually defined display time measured in 1/100 s).

=== Science ===
The speed of light in vacuum provides a convenient universal relationship between distance and time, so in physics (particularly in quantum physics) and often in chemistry, a jiffy is defined as the time taken for light to travel some specified distance. In astrophysics and quantum physics a jiffy is, as defined by Edward R. Harrison, the time it takes for light to travel one fermi, which is approximately the size of a nucleon. One fermi is 10^{−15} m, so a jiffy is about 3×10^{−24} s. It has also more informally been defined as "one light-foot", which is equal to approximately one nanosecond.

== See also ==
- System time
- BogoMips – which computes loops_per_jiffy
- TU (time unit)
- Orders of magnitude (time)
