= Multi-frequency time-division multiple access =

Communications technology

MF-TDMA ("Multi-frequency time-division multiple access") is a technology for dynamically sharing bandwidth resources in an over-the-air two-way communications network. It combines FDMA and TDMA by assigning each user a set of sub-bandwidths at particular times.

== See also ==
- Channel access method
- Time-division multiplex (TDM)
