= Nanosecond =

One billionth of a second

nanosecond
- Unit system: SI
- Unit of: time
- Symbol: ns

Conversions
1 ns in ...	... is equal to ...
- SI units: 10^{−9} s

A nanosecond (ns) is a unit of time in the International System of Units (SI) equal to one billionth of a second, that is, 1/1000000000 of a second, or 10^{−9} seconds.

The term combines the SI prefix nano- indicating a 1 billionth submultiple of an SI unit (e.g. nanogram, nanometre, etc.) and second, the primary unit of time in the SI.

A nanosecond is to one second, as one second is to approximately 31.69 years.

A nanosecond is equal to 1000 picoseconds or 1/1000 microsecond. Time units ranging between 10^{−8} and 10^{−7} seconds are typically expressed as tens or hundreds of nanoseconds.

Time units of this granularity are commonly found in telecommunications, pulsed lasers, and related aspects of electronics.

== Common measurements ==
- 0.001 nanoseconds – one picosecond
- 0.96 nanoseconds – 100 Gigabit Ethernet Interpacket gap
- 96 nanoseconds – Gigabit Ethernet Interpacket gap
- 1.0 nanosecond – cycle time of an electromagnetic wave with a frequency of 1 GHz (10^{9} hertz).
- 1.0 nanosecond – electromagnetic wavelength of 1 light-nanosecond. Equivalent to 0.3 m radio band.
- 1 nanosecond – time precision in Go
- 1.016703362164 nanoseconds (by definition) – time taken by light to travel 1 foot in vacuum. (Note: By definition of the "foot" as exactly 1/3 yards, and of the international yard as "exactly 0.9144 metres", and of the metre (SI unit) defined by the International Bureau of Weights and Measures as the "length of the path traveled by light in vacuum during a time interval of 1/299792458 of a second". The time taken by light to travel 1 foot in vacuum is therefore (1/299792458) × (0.9144/3) seconds, or 1.016703362164 nanoseconds.)
- 3.3356409519815 nanoseconds (by definition) – time taken by light to travel 1 metre in vacuum.
- 8 nanoseconds – typical propagation delay of 74HC series logic chips based on HCMOS technology, commonly used for digital electronics in the mid-1980s.
- 10 nanoseconds – one "shake", (as in a "shake of a lamb's tail") approximate time of one generation of a nuclear chain reaction with fast neutrons
- 10 nanoseconds – cycle time for frequency 100 MHz (10^{8} hertz), radio wavelength 3 m (VHF, FM band)
- 10 nanoseconds – half-life of lithium-12
- 12 nanoseconds – mean lifetime of a charged K meson
- 20–40 nanoseconds – time of fusion reaction in a hydrogen bomb
- 30 nanoseconds – half-life of carbon-21
- 77 nanoseconds – a sixth (a 60th of a 60th of a 60th of a 60th of a second)
- 100 nanoseconds – cycle time for frequency 10 MHz, radio wavelength 30 m (shortwave)
- 294.4 nanoseconds – half-life of polonium-212
- 333 nanoseconds – cycle time of highest medium wave radio frequency, 3 MHz
- 500 nanoseconds – T1 time of Josephson phase qubit (see also Qubit) as of May 2005
- 1000 nanoseconds – one microsecond

== See also ==
- International System of Units
- Jiffy (time)
- Microsecond
- Millisecond
- Orders of magnitude (time)
- Picosecond
- Second
