= Microsecond =

One millionth of a second

microsecond
- Unit system: SI
- Unit of: time
- Symbol: μs

Conversions
1 μs in ...	... is equal to ...
- SI units: 10^{−6} s

A microsecond is a unit of time in the International System of Units (SI) equal to one millionth (0.000001 or 10^{−6} or 1/1,000,000) of a second. Its symbol is μs, sometimes rendered as us when Unicode is not available.

A microsecond is equal to 1000 nanoseconds or 1/1,000 of a millisecond. Because the next higher SI prefix is 1000 times larger, measurements of 10^{−5} and 10^{−4} seconds are typically expressed as tens or hundreds of microseconds.

== Examples ==
- 1 microsecond (1 μs) – cycle time for frequency 1×10^{6} hertz (1 MHz), the inverse unit. This corresponds to radio wavelength 300 m (AM medium wave band), as can be calculated by multiplying 1 μs by the speed of light (approximately 3.00×10^{8} m/s).
- 1 microsecond – the length of time of a high-speed, commercial strobe light flash (see air-gap flash).
- 1 microsecond – protein folding takes place on the order of microseconds (thus this is the speed of carbon-based life).
- 1.8 microseconds – the amount of time subtracted from the Earth's day as a result of the 2011 Japanese earthquake.
- 2 microseconds – the lifetime of a muonium particle.
- 2.68 microseconds – the amount of time subtracted from the Earth's day as a result of the 2004 Indian Ocean earthquake.
- 3.33564095 microseconds – the time taken by light to travel one kilometre in a vacuum.
- 5.4 microseconds – the time taken by light to travel one mile in a vacuum (or radio waves point-to-point in a near vacuum).
- 8 microseconds – the time taken by light to travel one mile in typical single-mode fiber optic cable.
- 10 microseconds (μs) – cycle time for frequency 100 kHz, radio wavelength 3 km.
- 18 microseconds – net amount per year that the length of the day lengthens, largely due to tidal acceleration.
- 20.8 microseconds – sampling interval for digital audio with 48,000 samples/s.
- 22.7 microseconds – sampling interval for CD audio (44,100 samples/s).
- 38 microseconds – discrepancy in GPS satellite time per day (compensated by clock speed) due to relativity .
- 50 microseconds – cycle time for highest human-audible tone (20 kHz).
- 50 microseconds – to read the access latency for a modern solid state drive which holds non-volatile computer data.
- 100 microseconds (0.1 ms) – cycle time for frequency 10 kHz.
- 125 microseconds – common sampling interval for telephone audio (8000 samples/s).
- 164 microseconds – half-life of polonium-214.
- 240 microseconds – half-life of copernicium-277.
- 260 to 480 microseconds - return trip ICMP ping time, including operating system kernel TCP/IP processing and answer time, between two Gigabit Ethernet devices connected to the same local area network switch fabric.
- 277.8 microseconds – a fourth (a 60th of a 60th of a second), used in astronomical calculations by al-Biruni and Roger Bacon in 1000 and 1267 AD, respectively.
- 490 microseconds – time for light at a 1550 nm frequency to travel 100 km in a singlemode fiber optic cable (where speed of light is approximately 200 million metres per second due to its index of refraction).
- The average human eye blink takes 350,000 microseconds (just over 1/3 second).
- The average human finger snap takes 150,000 microseconds (just over 1/7 second).
- A camera flash illuminates for 1,000 microseconds or 1 millisecond.
- Standard camera shutter speed opens the shutter for 4,000 microseconds or 4 milliseconds.
- 584554 years of microseconds fit in 64 bits: (2**64)/(1e6*60*60*24*365.2425).

== See also ==
- International System of Units
- Jiffy (time)
- Orders of magnitude (time)
- Millisecond
- Nanosecond
- Picosecond
