= Mobile Slotted Aloha =

Network medium access control protocol

Mobile Slotted Aloha (MS-Aloha) is a wireless network protocol proposed for applications such as vehicle networks.

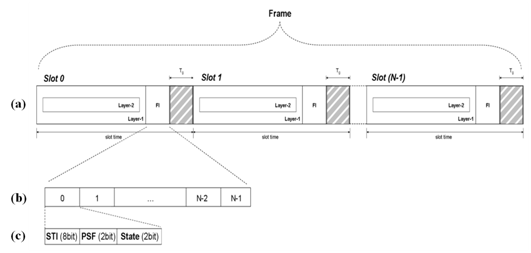
Frame structure of MS-Aloha: from top to bottom: (a) Slots 0…N-1 with Layer-1 and Layer-2 information, FI field, Guard Time Tg; (b) Subfields in each FI; (c) information contained in each subfield.

== Details ==
Considering the typical taxonomy of MAC protocols, MS-Aloha represents a hybrid solution. It is based on connection-oriented paradigm (hence may fall in the class of channel-based/TDMA protocols); however it is also very reactive to topology changes and does not include any reservations separate from data exchanges. It is classified among the packet-based and collision-free MAC methods.

In general, a slotted protocol can be either connectionless or connection-oriented. However, only the latter case represents a true alternative to IEEE 802.11p, by introducing the determinism which carrier sense multiple access with collision avoidance (CSMA/CA) lacks. In vehicle networks the connection set-up phases of a telephone call (reservation request, confirmation, data exchange, tear-down) cannot be applied (it does not hold for broadcast communications, it is hampered by hidden stations, it is not manageable with heavy losses, mobility and varying channel conditions). For these reasons MS-Aloha is connection oriented and continuously refreshes each reservation simply by transmitting each period. MS-Aloha adopts a different approach and subtends the following hypotheses and rules which, basically, define all its main mechanisms.

1. MS-Aloha needs a periodic frame structure, including fixed-length time slots which represent the distinct resources to be allocated. This is why MS-Aloha is called "slotted".
2. Any physical layer (PLCP, PMD) can be used, in particular, the same as IEEE 802.11p. MS-Aloha and IEEE 802.11p can be used in different frequencies with the same radio front-end.
3. The frame involves absolute synchronization, which subtends a Coordinated Universal Time (UTC), thus any node perfectly knows what is the current position in the frame, independently of the frames received. This is to prevent misalignment and clock loops. In order to counteract propagation delays, a guard-time (Tg) is also added. Hence, in the receiver’s perception, each MS-Aloha frame floats within the boundaries of the ideal time-slot, and PLCP is required to properly recover the start of each MS-Aloha frame.
4. A node attempting to reserve a slot can simply pick a free one. The same happens if it is already transmitting and wants to continue transmissions in next frame. A transmission is an implicit reservation for next frame. As a result, reservations are confirmed at each transmission. This is to manage mobility by a continuous, frame-by-frame reservation.
5. All the nodes append a description about the state of all the slots, based on the information received either directly or indirectly. The description is contained in the trailer Frame Information (FI), which must include as many subfields as the number of slots in the frame, in order to announce the state of each slot. This is meant to discover hidden terminals. To achieve a higher compliance to IEEE 802.11p and regardless of a precise application of ISO/OSI paradigm, FI can be moved inside upper layers, without any major impacts on the overall function.
6. Each node makes decisions on slot state based on (i) the transmissions directly sensed in each slot and (ii) the information carried by each FI received. The state of a slot can be free, busy or collision. A node announces his view of the channel in its FI.Consequently, if the slots in a frame are N, the state of a slot can be inferred by the correlation of up to N FIs. This redundancy can help hidden terminal detection as well as counteract effects of fading on signaling. The same information can be used by each node as an acknowledgment of its transmission and/or reservation.
7. If a collision on a slot is notified (in the FI State subfield), the colliding nodes must choose a new free slot.
8. Each node has to refresh its memory by flushing the information on slot J when the frame has reached position J-1. This is not to mix old and new announcements and to make the protocol suitable for mobility.
9. In MS-Aloha, Layer-1 is not specified but is supposed to be the same of IEEE 802.11p. Worthily, 802.11p provides the PLCP sub-layer which enables frame detection and alignment, required to recover from propagation delays as high as guard-time Tg.
10. The nested Layer-2 information corresponds to the classical 802.11p frame with only one main modification: in MS-Aloha a short identifier of the node (STI - 8 bit) is used inside the FI instead of MAC address, which is typically 48-bit long.
