= Israel Cidon =

Israeli professor of electrical engineering

- ישראל צידון
- Scientific career
- Fields: Computer Networking, Electrical Engineering
- Institutions: Cornell Tech, Technion–Israel Institute of Technology, VMware

Israel Cidon (Hebrew: ישראל צידון) is an Israeli professor of electrical engineering and entrepreneur. In 2023, he was appointed as the director of the Joan & Irwin Jacobs Technion-Cornell Institute at Cornell Tech.

He served as a faculty member and later as Dean at the Andrew and Erna Viterbi Faculty of Electrical and Computer Engineering at the Technion–Israel Institute of Technology. In addition to his academic roles, Cidon has co-founded several technology companies, including Micronet Ltd., Actona Technology, Viola Networks, and Sookasa. Cidon also worked at VMware Research, where he was Vice President and a researcher in high-performance networking technologies.

Throughout his career, Cidon has published over 180 peer-reviewed papers and holds 65 U.S. patents.
