= Picosecond =

One trillionth of a second

picosecond
- Unit system: SI
- Unit of: time
- Symbol: ps

Conversions
| 1 ps in ... | ... is equal to ... |
- SI units: 10^{−12} s

A picosecond (abbreviated as ps) is a unit of time in the International System of Units (SI) equal to 10^{−12} or 1/(1 000 000 000 000) (one trillionth) of a second. That is one trillionth, or one millionth of one millionth of a second, or 0.000 000 000 001 seconds.

A picosecond is to one second, as one second is to approximately 31,688.76 years.

Multiple technical approaches achieve imaging within single-digit picoseconds: for example, the streak camera or intensified CCD (ICCD) cameras are able to picture the motion of light.

One picosecond is equal to 1000 femtoseconds, or 1/1000 nanoseconds. Because the next SI unit is 1000 times larger, measurements of 10^{−11} and 10^{−10} second are typically expressed as tens or hundreds of picoseconds. Some notable measurements in this range include:

- 1.0 picoseconds (1.0 ps) – cycle time for electromagnetic frequency 1 terahertz (THz), an inverse unit. This corresponds to a wavelength of 0.3 mm, as can be calculated by multiplying 1 ps by the speed of light (approximately 3 × 10^{8} m/s) to determine the distance traveled. 1 THz is in the far infrared.
- 1 picosecond – time taken by light in vacuum to travel approximately 0.30 mm
- 1 picosecond – half-life of a bottom quark
- ~1 picosecond – lifetime of a single H_{3}O^{+} (hydronium) ion in water at 20 °C
- picoseconds to nanoseconds – phenomena observable by dielectric spectroscopy
- 1.2 picoseconds – switching time of the world's fastest transistor (845 GHz, as of 2006)
- 1.7 picoseconds – rotational correlation time of water
- 3.3 picoseconds (approximately) – time taken for light to travel 1 millimeter
- 10 picoseconds after the Big Bang – electromagnetism separates from the other fundamental forces
- 34 picoseconds – signal rise time (20% to 80%) of a SFP+ transmitter for 10 Gigabit Ethernet.
- 10 to 150 picoseconds – rotational correlation times of a molecule (184 g/mol) from hot to frozen water
- 100 picoseconds – Unit Interval of a 10 Gbit/s serial communication link, such as USB 3.1.
- 108.7827757 picoseconds – transition time between the two hyperfine levels of the ground state of the caesium-133 atom at absolute zero
- 330 picoseconds (approximately) – the time it takes a common 3.0 GHz computer CPU to complete a processing cycle

== See also ==
- SI unit
- Second
- Nanosecond
- Microsecond
- Millisecond
- Jiffy (time)
- Orders of magnitude (time)
