= Channel access method =

Means for multiple terminals to communicate over one medium

In telecommunications and computer networks, a channel access method or multiple access method allows more than two terminals connected to the same transmission medium to transmit over it and to share its capacity. Examples of shared physical media are wireless networks, bus networks, ring networks and point-to-point links operating in half-duplex mode.

A channel access method is based on multiplexing, which allows several data streams or signals to share the same communication channel or transmission medium. In this context, multiplexing is provided by the physical layer.

A channel access method may also be a part of the multiple access protocol and control mechanism, also known as medium access control (MAC). Medium access control deals with issues such as addressing, assigning multiplex channels to different users and avoiding collisions. Media access control is a sub-layer in the data link layer of the OSI model and a component of the link layer of the TCP/IP model.

== Issues ==
There are two main issues with the shared media that channel access method needs to resolve, collisions and starvation:

- collisions might happen when two or more terminals try to transmit messages at the same time;
- starvation is a situation when a particular terminal is unable to transmit a message for a long time due to the other terminals transmitting their data.

The channel access methods resolve the collision issue through collision avoidance and the starvation through fairness.

== Fundamental schemes ==
Several ways of categorizing multiple-access schemes and protocols have been used in the literature. For example, Daniel Minoli (2009) identifies five principal types of multiple-access schemes: FDMA, TDMA, CDMA, SDMA, and random access. R. Rom and M. Sidi (1990) categorize the protocols into Conflict-free access protocols, Aloha protocols, and Carrier Sensing protocols.

The Telecommunications Handbook (Terplan and Morreale, 2000) identifies the following MAC categories:

- Fixed assigned: TDMA, FDMA+WDMA, CDMA, SDMA
- Demand assigned (DA)
  - Reservation: DA/TDMA, DA/FDMA+DA/WDMA, DA/CDMA, DA/SDMA
  - Polling: Generalized polling, Distributed polling, Token Passing, Implicit polling, Slotted access
- Random access (RA): Pure RA (ALOHA, GRA), Adaptive RA (TRA), CSMA, CSMA/CD, CSMA/CA

Channel access schemes generally fall into the following categories.

=== Frequency-division multiple access ===
The frequency-division multiple access (FDMA) channel-access scheme is the most standard analog system, based on the frequency-division multiplexing (FDM) scheme, which provides different frequency bands to different data streams. In the FDMA case, the frequency bands are allocated to different nodes or devices. An example of FDMA systems was the first-generation 1G cell-phone systems, where each phone call was assigned to a specific uplink frequency channel and another downlink frequency channel. Each message signal (each phone call) is modulated on a specific carrier frequency.

A related technique is wavelength division multiple access (WDMA), based on wavelength-division multiplexing (WDM), where different data streams get different colors in fiber-optical communications. In the WDMA case, different network nodes in a bus or hub network get a different color.

An advanced form of FDMA is the orthogonal frequency-division multiple access (OFDMA) scheme, for example, used in 4G cellular communication systems. In OFDMA, each node may use several sub-carriers, making it possible to provide different quality of service (different data rates) to different users. The assignment of sub-carriers to users may be changed dynamically, based on the current radio channel conditions and traffic load. Single-carrier FDMA (SC-FDMA), a.k.a. linearly-precoded OFDMA (LP-OFDMA), is based on single-carrier frequency-domain-equalization (SC-FDE).

=== Time-division multiple access ===
The time-division multiple access (TDMA) channel access scheme is based on the time-division multiplexing (TDM) scheme. TDMA provides different time slots to different transmitters in a cyclically repetitive frame structure. For example, node 1 may use time slot 1, node 2 time slot 2, etc., until the last transmitter, when it starts over. An advanced form is dynamic TDMA (DTDMA), where an assignment of transmitters to time slots varies on each frame.

Multi-frequency time-division multiple access (MF-TDMA) combines time and frequency multiple access. As an example, 2G cellular systems are based on a combination of TDMA and FDMA. Each frequency channel is divided into eight time slots, of which seven are used for seven phone calls and one for signaling data.

Statistical time-division multiplexing multiple access is typically also based on time-domain multiplexing, but not in a cyclically repetitive frame structure. Due to its random character, it can be categorized as statistical multiplexing methods and capable of dynamic bandwidth allocation. This requires a media access control (MAC) protocol, i.e., a principle for the nodes to take turns on the channel and to avoid collisions. Common examples are CSMA/CD, used in Ethernet bus networks and hub networks, and CSMA/CA, used in wireless networks such as IEEE 802.11.

=== Code-division multiple access and spread spectrum multiple access ===
The code-division multiple access (CDMA) scheme is based on spread spectrum, meaning that a wider radio channel bandwidth is used than the data rate of individual bit streams requires, and several message signals are transferred simultaneously over the same carrier frequency, utilizing different spreading codes. Per the Shannon–Hartley theorem, the wide bandwidth makes it possible to send with a signal-to-noise ratio of much less than 1 (less than 0 dB), meaning that the transmission power can be reduced to a level below the level of the noise and co-channel interference from other message signals sharing the same frequency range.

One form is direct-sequence CDMA (DS-CDMA), based on direct-sequence spread spectrum (DSSS), used for example in 3G cell phone systems. Each information bit (or each symbol) is represented by a long code sequence of several pulses, called chips. The sequence is the spreading code, and each message signal (for example, each phone call) uses a different spreading code.

Another form is frequency-hopping CDMA (FH-CDMA), based on frequency-hopping spread spectrum (FHSS), where the channel frequency is changed rapidly according to a sequence that constitutes the spreading code. As an example, the Bluetooth communication system is based on a combination of frequency-hopping and either CSMA/CA statistical time-division multiplexing communication (for data communication applications) or TDMA (for audio transmission). All nodes belonging to the same user (to the same piconet) use the same frequency hopping sequence synchronously, meaning that they send on the same frequency channel, but CDMA/CA or TDMA is used to avoid collisions within the virtual personal area network (VPAN). Frequency-hopping is used by Bluetooth to reduce the cross-talk and collision probability between nodes in different VPANs.

Other techniques include OFDMA and multi-carrier code-division multiple access (MC-CDMA).

=== Space-division multiple access ===
Space-division multiple access (SDMA) transmits different information in different physical areas. Examples include simple cellular radio systems and more advanced cellular systems that use directional antennas and power modulation to refine spatial transmission patterns.

=== Power-division multiple access ===
Power-division multiple access (PDMA) scheme is based on using variable transmission power between users in order to share the available power on the channel. Examples include multiple SCPC modems on a satellite transponder, where users get on demand a larger share of the power budget to transmit at higher data rates.

=== Packet mode methods ===
Packet mode channel access methods select a single network transmitter for the duration of a packet transmission. Some methods are more suited to wired communication, while others are more suited to wireless.

Common statistical time-division multiplexing multiple access protocols for wired multi-drop networks include:

- Carrier-sense multiple access with collision detection (CSMA/CD), used in Ethernet and IEEE 802.3
- Multiple Access with Collision Avoidance (MACA)
- Multiple Access with Collision Avoidance for Wireless (MACAW)
- Carrier-sense multiple access (CSMA)
- Carrier-sense multiple access with collision avoidance and resolution using priorities (CSMA/CARP)
- Bitwise Arbitration based on constructive interference as used on CAN bus
- Token bus (IEEE 802.4)
- Token Ring (IEEE 802.5)
- Token passing, used in FDDI
- Dynamic time-division multiple access (Dynamic TDMA)

Common multiple access protocols that may be used in packet radio wireless networks include:

- Carrier-sense multiple access with collision avoidance (CSMA/CA), used in IEEE 802.11/WiFi, potentially using a distributed coordination function
- ALOHA and slotted ALOHA, used in ALOHAnet
- Reservation ALOHA (R-ALOHA)
- Mobile Slotted Aloha (MS-ALOHA)
- Code-division multiple access (CDMA)
- Orthogonal frequency-division multiple access (OFDMA)
- Orthogonal frequency-division multiplexing (OFDM)

=== Duplexing methods ===
Where these methods are used for dividing forward and reverse communication channels, they are known as duplexing methods. A duplexing communication system can be either half-duplex or full duplex. In a half-duplex system, communication only works in one direction at a time. A walkie-talkie is an example of a half-duplex system because both users can communicate with one another, but not at the same time; someone has to finish transmitting before the next person can begin. In a full-duplex system, both users can communicate at the same time. A telephone is the most common example of a full-duplex system because both users can speak and be heard at the same time on each end. Some types of full-duplexing methods are:

- Time-division duplex (TDD)
- Frequency-division duplex (FDD)
- Echo cancellation

== Hybrid application examples ==
Note that hybrids of these techniques are frequently used. Some examples:

- The GSM cellular system combines the use of frequency-division duplex (FDD) to prevent interference between outward and return signals, with FDMA and TDMA to allow multiple handsets to work in a single cell.
- GSM with the GPRS packet-switched service combines FDD and FDMA with slotted Aloha for reservation inquiries and a dynamic TDMA scheme for transferring the actual data.
- Bluetooth packet mode communication combines frequency hopping for shared channel access among several private area networks in the same room with CSMA/CA for shared channel access within a network.
- IEEE 802.11b wireless local area networks (WLANs) are based on FDMA and DS-CDMA for avoiding interference among adjacent WLAN cells or access points. This is combined with CSMA/CA for multiple access within the cell.
- HIPERLAN/2 wireless networks combine FDMA with dynamic TDMA, meaning that resource reservation is achieved by packet scheduling.
- G.hn, an ITU-T standard for high-speed networking over home wiring (power lines, phone lines and coaxial cables) employs a combination of TDMA, token passing and CSMA/CARP to allow multiple devices to share the medium.

== Application-specific definitions ==
Different channel access constraints and schemes apply to different applications.

=== Local and metropolitan area networks ===
In local area networks (LANs) and metropolitan area networks (MANs), multiple access methods enable bus networks, ring networks, star networks, wireless networks and half-duplex point-to-point communication, but are not required in full-duplex point-to-point serial lines between network switches and routers. The most common multiple access method is CSMA/CD, which is used in Ethernet. Although today's Ethernet installations use full-duplex connections directly to switches. CSMA/CD is still implemented to achieve compatibility with older repeater hubs.

=== Satellite communications ===
In satellite communications, multiple access is the capability of a communications satellite to function as a portion of a communications link between more than one pair of ground-based terminals concurrently. Three types of multiple access presently used with communications satellites are code-division, frequency-division, and time-division multiple access.

=== Cellular networks ===
In cellular networks, the two most widely adopted technologies are CDMA and TDMA. TDMA technology works by identifying natural breaks in speech and utilizing one radio wave to support multiple transmissions in turn. In CDMA technology, each individual packet receives a unique code that is broken up over a wide frequency spectrum and is then reassembled on the other end. CDMA allows multiple people to speak at the same time over the same frequency, allowing more conversations to be transmitted over the same amount of spectrum; this is one reason why CDMA eventually became the most widely adopted channel access method in the wireless industry.

The origins of CDMA can be traced back to the 1940s, when it was patented by the United States government and used throughout World War II to transmit messages. However, following the war the patent expired and the use of CDMA diminished and was widely replaced by TDMA. That was until Irwin M. Jacobs an MIT engineer, and fellow employees from the company Linkabit founded the telecommunications company Qualcomm. At the time Qualcomm was founded, Jacobs had already been working on addressing telecommunications problems for the military using digital technology to increase the capacity of spectrum. Qualcomm knew that CDMA would greatly increase the efficiency and availability of wireless, but the wireless industry having already invested millions of dollars into TDMA was skeptical. Jacobs and Qualcomm spent several years improving infrastructure and performing tests and demonstrations of CDMA. In 1993, CDMA became accepted as the wireless industry standard. By 1995, CDMA was being used commercially in the wireless industry as the foundation of 2G.

== See also ==
- Diversity scheme
- Dynamic bandwidth allocation
- Radio resource management for inter-base station interference control

== Sources ==
- Howser, Gerry (2019-12-23). Computer Networks and the Internet: A Hands-On Approach. Springer Nature. ISBN 978-3-030-34496-2.

This article incorporates public domain material from Federal Standard 1037C. General Services Administration. Archived from the original on 2022-01-22. (in support of MIL-STD-188).
