= Moshe Sidi =

Electrical engineering professor

- משה סידי
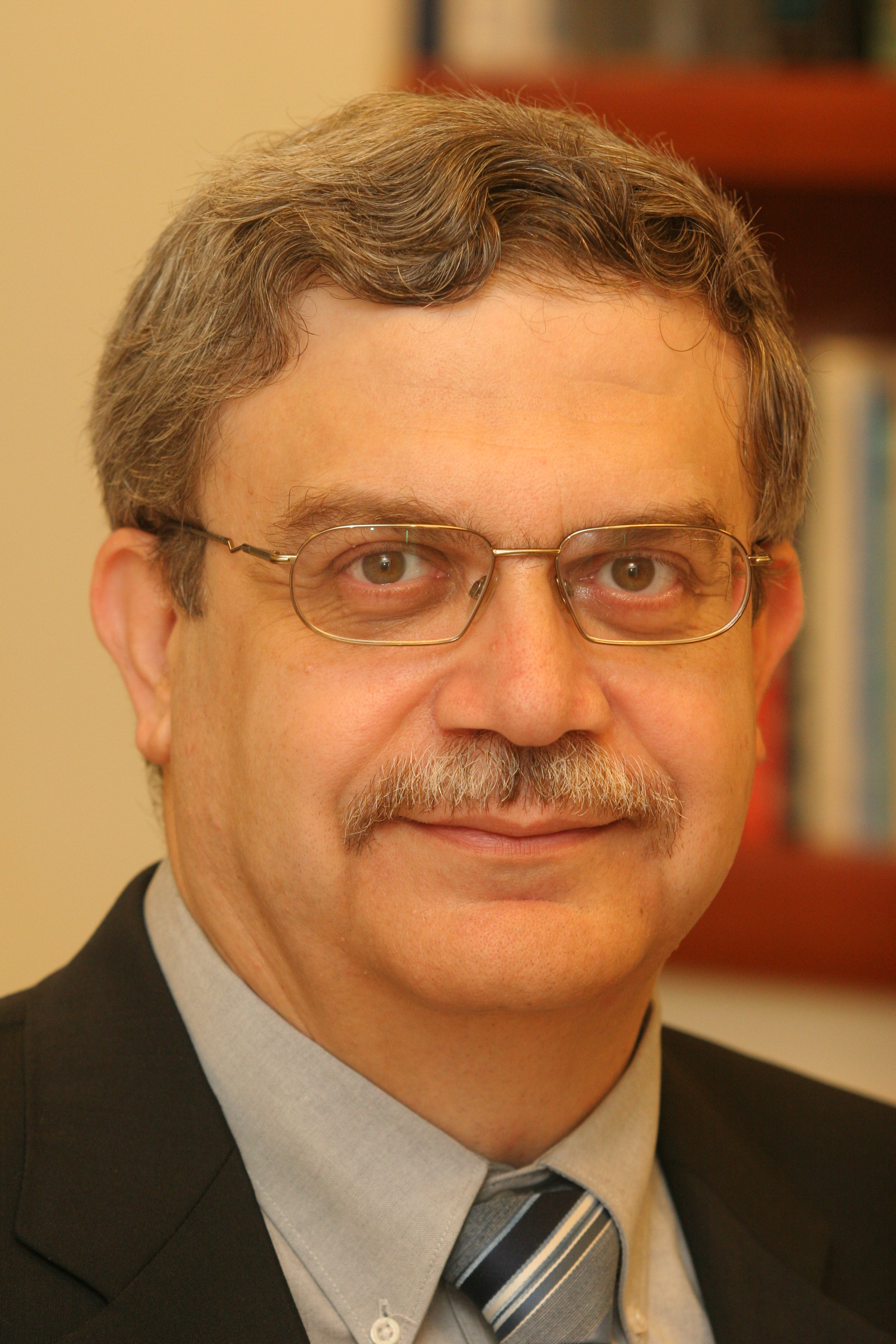
- Education: Technion, MIT
- Scientific career
- Fields: computer communication networks
- Workplaces: Technion
- Thesis: Interfering Queues in Packet Radio Networks (1982)
- Doctoral advisor: Adrian Segall

Moshe Sidi (Hebrew: משה סידי; born 1953) is a professor emeritus in the Faculty of Electrical and Computer Engineering at the Technion - Israel Institute of Technology.

Sidi served as the Senior Executive Vice President and Executive Vice President for Academic Affairs of the Technion, and as Executive Director of the Neaman Institute for National Policy Research.

== Early life and education ==
Moshe Sidi was born in Ramla, Israel. He graduated from the Ramla-Lod high school.

He began his academic studies in Electrical Engineering at the Technion, and received his B.Sc. in 1975, and M.Sc. in 1979. He continued his Ph.D. studies at the Technion until 1982. His thesis on Interfering Queues in Packet Radio Networks was supervised by Prof. Adrian Segall.

== Career ==
Sidi joined the Faculty of Electrical and Computer Engineering at the Technion in 1982 as a lecturer. He became a senior lecturer in 1986, and an associate professor in 1990. He was promoted to full professor in 1997.

In 2001 he became the incumbent of a Technion Chair in Electrical Engineering and in 2013 he became the incumbent of the Louis and Miriam Benjamin Chair in Computer-Communication Networks. He retired as a professor emeritus in 2021.

Beginning in 2004, Sidi held official positions at the Technion, starting as Dean of the Electrical Engineering Faculty (2004–2005), Executive Vice President for Academic Affairs (2006–2012), Senior Executive Vice President (2013–2016) and Executive Director of the Neaman Institute for National Policy Research (2017–2020).

During the years, Sidi held visiting academic positions at other universities and research institutes, including Postdoctoral Associate at Massachusetts Institute of Technology, Visiting Scientist at Columbia University, IBM and T. J. Watson Research Center, and at SUN Microsystems, Mountain View, CA.

Sidi has supervised 8 Ph.D. students and 29 M.Sc. students and authored over 170 scientific publications in major journals and conferences and 10 patents.

== Research ==
Sidi's research focused on wireless networks and multiple access protocols; queuing modeling and performance evaluation of computer communication networks and traffic characterization and guaranteed grade of service in high-speed networks.

== Professional activities ==
Sidi was an Editor in Wireless Networks: The Journal of Mobile Communication, Computation and Information. He is Founding Editor of the IEEE/ACM Transactions on Networking, and was Associate Editor for Communication Networks and Computer Networks in the IEEE Transactions on Information Theory. He was also Editor for Communication Networks in the IEEE Transactions on Communications and he is a senior member of IEEE.

Sidi was the General Chair of Infocom 2000 that was held in Israel.

During the years 1999-2007 Sidi served as the chief scientist of Viola Networks, a maker of networking test software.

== Publications ==
=== Book ===
R. Rom and M. Sidi, “Multiple Access Protocols: Performance and Analysis”, Springer-Verlag, New York, 1990.

=== Selected articles ===
- A. Bar-Noy, I. Kessler and M. Sidi, “Mobile Users: To Update or not to Update?” Wireless Networks: The Journal of Mobile Communication, Computation and Information, Vol. 1, pp. 175–185, 1995.
- H. Levy and M. Sidi, “Polling Systems: Applications, Modeling and Optimization,” invited paper, IEEE Transactions on Communications, Vol. COM–38, No. 10, pp. 1750–1760, October 1990.
- O. Yaron and M. Sidi, “Performance and Stability of Communication Networks via Robust Exponential Bounds,” IEEE/ACM Transactions on Networking, Vol. 1, No. 3, pp. 372–385, June 1993.
- D. Starobinski and M. Sidi, “Stochastically Bounded Burstiness for Communication Networks,” IEEE Transactions on Information Theory, Vol. IT–46, No. 1, pp. 206–216, January 2000.
- O. Gurewitz, I. Cidon and M. Sidi, “One-Way Delay Estimation Using Network-Wide Measurements,” IEEE Transactions on Information Theory, Vol. 52, No. 6, pp. 2710-2724, June 2006.
- A. Segall and M. Sidi, “A Failsafe Distributed Protocol for Minimum Delay Routing,” IEEE Transactions on Communications, Vol. COM–29, No. 5, pp. 689–695, May 1981.
- I. Cidon and M. Sidi, “Distributed Assignment Algorithms for Multi-Hop Packet-Radio Networks,” IEEE Transactions on Computers, Vol. 38, No. 10, pp. 1353–1361, October 1989.
