= Slot time =

Time it takes to send a designated amount of data from one network host to another

Slot time is a concept in computer networking. It is at least twice the time it takes for an electronic pulse (OSI Layer 1 - Physical) to travel the length of the maximum theoretical distance between two nodes. In CSMA/CD networks such as Ethernet, the slot time is an upper limit on the acquisition of the medium, a limit on the length of a packet fragment generated by a collision, and the scheduling quantum for retransmission.

Since a pulse's runtime will never exceed slot time (the maximum theoretical time for a frame to travel a network), the network interface controller, or NIC waits a minimum of slot time before retransmitting after a collision happened, in order to allow any pulse that was initiated at the time that the waiting NIC was requested to send, to reach all other nodes. By allowing the pulse to reach the waiting NIC, a local collision occurs (i.e. while still sending) rather than a late collision occurring (after sending may or may not have ended). By having the collision occur at the NIC (local) and not on the wire (late) CSMA/CD implementation recover the situation by retransmitting later.

Some times for Ethernet slot time include:

Speed	Slot time	Time Interval
10 Mbit/s	512 bit times	51.2 microseconds
100 Mbit/s	512 bit times	5.12 microseconds
1 Gbit/s	4096 bit times	4.096 microseconds
2.5 Gbit/s onward	no half-duplex operation	

See DIFS for information on 802.11x slot times.
