= Crest factor =

Peak divided by the Root mean square (RMS) of the waveform

Crest factor is a parameter of a waveform, such as alternating current or sound, showing the ratio of largest value to the more typical value. More specifically, crest factor is the peak amplitude of the waveform divided by the root mean square (RMS) value of the waveform. The minimum possible crest factor is 1 or 1:1.

Crest factor indicates how extreme the peaks are in a waveform. Crest factor 1 indicates no peaks, such as direct current or a square wave. Higher crest factors indicate more pronounced peaks, for example sound waves tend to have high crest factors.

The peak-to-average power ratio (PAPR) is the peak power (peak amplitude squared) divided by the average power (mean square or squared RMS). PAPR is the square of the crest factor.

Crest factor and PAPR are both dimensionless quantities. While the crest factor is defined as a positive real number, in commercial products it is also commonly stated as the ratio of two whole numbers, e.g., 2:1. The PAPR is most used in signal processing applications. As it is a power ratio, it is normally expressed in decibels (dB). When expressed in decibels, crest factor and PAPR are numerically equal, due to the way decibels are calculated for power ratios vs amplitude ratios.

The crest factor of the test signal is a fairly important issue in loudspeaker testing standards; in this context it is usually expressed in dB.

== Examples ==
This table provides values for some normalized waveforms. All peak magnitudes have been normalized to 1.

Wave type	Waveform	RMS value	Crest factor	PAPR (dB)
DC		1	1	0.0 dB
Sine wave		${1 \over \sqrt{2}} \approx 0.707$	$\sqrt{2} \approx 1.414$	3.01 dB
Full-wave rectified sine		${1 \over \sqrt{2}} \approx 0.707$	$\sqrt{2} \approx 1.414$	3.01 dB
Half-wave rectified sine		${1 \over 2 } = 0.5$	$2 \,$	6.02 dB
Triangle wave		${1 \over \sqrt{3}} \approx 0.577$	$\sqrt{3} \approx 1.732$	4.77 dB
Square wave		1	1	0 dB
PWM signal V(t) ≥ 0.0 V		$\sqrt{ \frac{t_1}{T}}$	$\sqrt{\frac{T}{t_1}}$	$20\log\mathord\left(\frac{T}{t_1}\right)$ dB
QPSK		1	1	1.761 dB
8PSK				3.3 dB
π/4-DQPSK				3.0 dB
OQPSK				3.3 dB
8VSB				6.5–8.1 dB
64QAM		$\sqrt{ \frac{3}{7} }$	$\sqrt{ \frac{7}{3} } \approx 1.528$	3.7 dB
$\infty$-QAM		${1 \over \sqrt{3}} \approx 0.577$	$\sqrt{3} \approx 1.732$	4.8 dB
WCDMA downlink carrier				10.6 dB
OFDM			4	~12 dB
GMSK		1	1	0 dB
Gaussian noise		$\sigma$	$\infty$	$\infty$ dB
Periodic chirp		${1 \over \sqrt{2}} \approx 0.707$	$\sqrt{2} \approx 1.414$	3.01 dB

Notes:

1. Crest factors specified for QPSK, QAM, WCDMA are typical factors needed for reliable communication, not the theoretical crest factors which can be larger.

== Crest factor reduction ==
Many modulation techniques have been specifically designed to have constant envelope modulation, i.e., the minimum possible crest factor of 1:1.

In general, modulation techniques that have smaller crest factors usually transmit more bits per second than modulation techniques that have higher crest factors. This is because:

1. any given linear amplifier has some "peak output power"—some maximum possible instantaneous peak amplitude it can support and still stay in the linear range;
2. the average power of the signal is the peak output power divided by the crest factor;
3. the number of bits per second transmitted (on average) is proportional to the average power transmitted (Shannon–Hartley theorem).

Orthogonal frequency-division multiplexing (OFDM) is a very promising modulation technique; perhaps its biggest problem is its high crest factor. Many crest factor reduction techniques (CFR) have been proposed for OFDM. The reduction in crest factor results in a system that can either transmit more bits per second with the same hardware, or transmit the same bits per second with lower-power hardware (and therefore lower electricity costs and less expensive hardware), or both.

=== Crest factor reduction methods ===
Various methods for crest factor reduction exist, such as peak windowing, noise shaping, pulse injection and peak cancellation.

== Applications ==
- Electrical engineering — for describing the quality of an AC power waveform
- Vibration analysis — for estimating the amount of impact wear in a bearing
- Radio and audio electronics — for estimating the headroom required in a signal chain
  - Music has a widely varying crest factor. Typical values for a processed mix are around 4–8 (which corresponds to 12–18 dB of headroom, usually involving audio level compression), and 8–10 for an unprocessed recording (18–20 dB).
- Physiology — for analysing the sound of snoring

== See also ==
- Clipping (signal processing)
- Form factor (electronics)
