= Orders of magnitude (time) =

Comparison of a wide range of timescales

An order of magnitude of time is usually a decimal prefix or decimal order-of-magnitude quantity together with a base unit of time, like a microsecond or a million years. In some cases, the order of magnitude may be implied (usually 1), like a "second" or "year." In other cases, the quantity name implies the base unit, like "century." In most cases, the base unit is a second or a year.

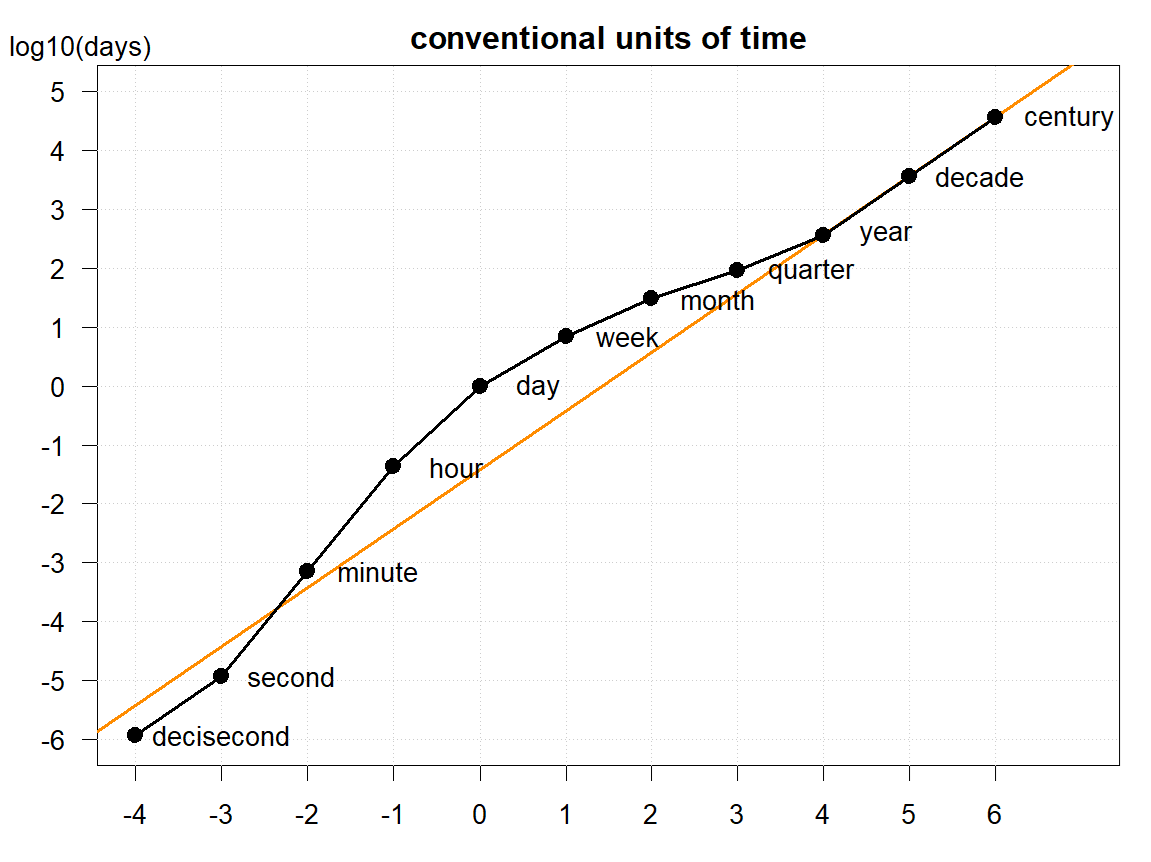
Base-10 logarithms of ten conventional units of time plotted against a linear scale.

Prefixes are not usually used with a base unit of years. Therefore, it is said "a million years" instead of "a megayear." Clock time and calendar time have duodecimal or sexagesimal orders of magnitude rather than decimal, e.g., a year is 12 months, and a minute is 60 seconds.

The smallest measurable increment of time is Planck time –the time light takes to traverse the Planck distance, many decimal orders of magnitude smaller than a second. However, the Planck time is not a quantum of time, as both general relativity and quantum mechanics treat time as continuous.

The largest realized amount of time, based on known scientific data, is the age of the universe, about 13.8 billion years — the time since the Big Bang as measured in the cosmic microwave background rest frame. Those amounts of time together span 60 decimal orders of magnitude. Metric prefixes are defined spanning 10^{−30} to 10^{30}, 60 decimal orders of magnitude which may be used in conjunction with the metric base unit of second.

Metric units of time larger than the second are most commonly seen only in a few scientific contexts such as observational astronomy and materials science, although this depends on the author. For everyday use and most other scientific contexts, the common units of minutes, hours (3 600 s or 3.6 ks), days (86 400 s), weeks, months, and years (of which there are a number of variations) are commonly used. Weeks, months, and years are significantly variable units whose lengths depend on the choice of calendar and are often not regular even with a calendar, e.g., leap years versus regular years in the Gregorian calendar. This makes them problematic for use against a linear and regular time scale such as that defined by the SI, since it is not clear which version is being used.

Because of this, the table below does not include weeks, months, and years. Instead, the table uses the annum or astronomical Julian year (365.25 days of 86 400 seconds), denoted with the symbol a. Its definition is based on the average length of a year according to the Julian calendar, which has one leap year every four years. According to the geological science convention, this is used to form larger units of time by the application of SI prefixes to it; at least up to giga-annum or Ga, equal to 1 000 000 000 a (short scale: one billion years, long scale: one milliard years).

== Less than one second ==
Units of measure less than a second
Multiple of a second	Unit	Symbol	Definition	Comparative examples & common units
10^{−44}	Planck time	t_{P}	Presumed to be the shortest theoretically measurable time interval (but not necessarily the shortest increment of time—see quantum gravity)	10^{−14} qs: The length of one Planck time (t_{P} = $\sqrt{\hbar G/c^5}$ ≈ 5.39×10^{−44} s) is the briefest physically meaningful span of time. It is the unit of time in the natural units system known as Planck units.
10^{−30}	quectosecond	qs	Quectosecond, (quecto- + second), is one nonillionth of a second	
10^{−27}	rontosecond	rs	Rontosecond, (ronto- + second), is one octillionth of a second	300 rs: The mean lifetime of W and Z bosons
10^{−24}	yoctosecond	ys	Yoctosecond, (yocto- + second), is one septillionth of a second	86 ys: The estimated value on the half-life of isotope 5 of hydrogen (hydrogen-5); 143 ys: The half-life of the nitrogen-10 isotope of nitrogen 156 ys: The mean lifetime of a Higgs boson
10^{−21}	zeptosecond	zs	Zeptosecond, (zepto- + second), is one sextillionth of one second	1.3 zs: Smallest experimentally controlled time delay in a photon field. 2 zs: The representative cycle time of gamma ray radiation released in the decay of a radioactive atomic nucleus (here as 2 MeV per emitted photon); 4 zs: The cycle time of the zitterbewegung of an electron ($\omega=2m_e c^2/\hbar$) 247 zs: The experimentally measured travel time of a photon across a hydrogen molecule, "for the average bond length of molecular hydrogen"
10^{−18}	attosecond	as	One quintillionth of one second	12 as: The best timing control of laser pulses. 43 as: The shortest X-ray laser pulse 53 as: The shortest electron laser pulse
10^{−15}	femtosecond	fs	One quadrillionth of one second	1 fs: The cycle time for ultraviolet light with a wavelength of 300 nanometres; the time it takes light to travel a distance of 0.3 micrometres (μm). 7.58 fs: The period of vibration of a hydrogen molecule. 140 fs: The time needed for electrons to have localized onto individual bromine atoms 6 Ångstrom apart after laser dissociation of Br_{2}. 290 fs: The lifetime of a tauon
10^{−12}	picosecond	ps	One trillionth of one second	1 ps: The mean lifetime of a bottom quark; the time needed for light to travel 0.3 millimetres (mm); 1 ps: The typical lifetime of a transition state one machine cycle by an IBM silicon-germanium transistor 109 ps: The period of the photon corresponding to the hyperfine transition of the ground state of caesium-133, and one 9,192,631,770th of one second by definition 114.6 ps: The time for the fastest overclocked processor as of 2014 to execute one machine cycle. 696 ps: How much more a second lasts far away from Earth's gravity due to the effects of general relativity
10^{−9}	nanosecond	ns	One billionth of one second	1 ns: The time needed to execute one machine cycle by a 1 GHz microprocessor 1 ns: The time light takes to travel 30 cm (11.811 in)
10^{−6}	microsecond	μs	One millionth of one second	1 μs: The time needed to execute one machine cycle by an Intel 80186 microprocessor 2.2 μs: The lifetime of a muon 4–16 μs: The time needed to execute one machine cycle by a 1960s minicomputer
10^{−3}	millisecond	ms	One thousandth of one second	1 ms: The time for a neuron in the human brain to fire one impulse and return to rest 4–8 ms: The typical seek time for a computer hard disk
10^{−2}	centisecond	cs	One hundredth of one second	1.6667 cs: The period of a frame at a frame rate of 60 Hz. 2 cs: The cycle time for European 50 Hz AC electricity 10–20 cs (0.1–0.2 s): The human reflex response to visual stimuli
10^{−1}	decisecond	ds	One tenth of a second	1–4 ds (0.1–0.4 s): The length of a single blink of an eye

== More than one second ==
In this table, large intervals of time surpassing one second are catalogued in order of the SI multiples of the second as well as their equivalent in common time units of minutes, hours, days, and Julian years.

Units of measure greater than one second
Multiple of a second	Unit	Symbol	Common units	Comparative examples and common units
10^{1}	decasecond	das	single seconds (1 das = 10 s)	6 das: One minute (min), the time it takes a second hand to cycle around a clock face
10^{2}	hectosecond	hs	minutes (1 hs = 1 min 40 s = 100 s)	2 hs (3 min 20 s): The average length of the most popular YouTube videos as of January 2017; 5.55 hs (9 min 12 s): The longest videos in the above study 7.1 hs (11 min 50 s): The time for a human walking at average speed of 1.4 m/s to walk 1 kilometre 9 hs (14 min): The time for Neutronium-1 to decay
10^{3}	kilosecond	ks	minutes, hours, days (1 ks = 16 min 40 s = 1,000 s)	1 ks: The record confinement time for antimatter, specifically antihydrogen, in electrically neutral state as of 2011; 1.477 ks: The longest period in which a person has not taken a breath. 1.8 ks: The time slot for the typical situation comedy on television with advertisements included 2.28 ks: The duration of the Anglo-Zanzibar War, the shortest war in recorded history. 3.6 ks: The length of one hour (h), the time for the minute hand of a clock to cycle once around the face, approximately 1/24 of one mean solar day 7.2 ks (2 h): The typical length of feature films 35.73 ks: the rotational period of planet Jupiter, fastest planet to rotate 38.0196 ks: rotational period of Saturn, second shortest rotational period 57.996 ks: one day on planet Neptune. 62.064 ks: one day on Uranus. 86.399 ks (23 h 59 min 59 s): The length of one day with a removed leap second on UTC time scale. Such has not yet occurred. 86.4 ks (24 h): The length of one day of Earth by standard. More exactly, the mean solar day is 86.400 002 ks due to tidal braking, and increasing at the rate of approximately 2 ms/century; to correct for this time standards like UTC use leap seconds with the interval described as "a day" on them being most often 86.4 ks exactly by definition but occasionally one second more or less so that every day contains a whole number of seconds while preserving alignment with astronomical time. The hour hand of an analogue clock will typically cycle twice around the dial in this period as most analogue clocks are 12-hour, less common are analogue 24-hour clocks in which it cycles around once. 86.401 ks (24 h 0 min 1 s): One day with an added leap second on UTC time scale. While this is strictly 24 hours and 1 second in conventional units, a digital clock of suitable capability level will most often display the leap second as 23:59:60 and not 24:00:00 before rolling over to 00:00:00 the next day, as though the last "minute" of the day was crammed with 61 seconds and not 60, and similarly the last "hour" was crammed with 3,601 seconds instead of 3,600. 88.775 ks (24 h 39 min 35 s): One sol of Mars 604.8 ks (7 d): One week of the Gregorian calendar
10^{6}	megasecond	Ms	weeks to years (1 Ms = 11 d 13 h 46 min 40 s = 1,000,000 s)	1.6416 Ms (19 d): The length of a month of the Baháʼí calendar 2.36 Ms (27.32 d): The length of the true month, the orbital period of the Moon 2.4192 Ms (28 d): The length of February, the shortest month of the Gregorian calendar, in common years 2.5056 Ms (29 d): The length of February in leap years 2.592 Ms (30 d): The length of April, June, September, and November in the Gregorian calendar; common interval used in legal agreements and contracts as a proxy for a month 2.6784 Ms (31 d): The length of the longest months of the Gregorian calendar 23 Ms (270 d): The approximate length of typical human gestational period 31.5576 Ms (365.25 d): The length of the Julian year, also called the annum, symbol a. 5.06703168 Ms: The rotational period of Mercury. 7.600544064 Ms: One year on Mercury. 19.41414912 Ms: One year on Venus. 20.9967552 Ms: The rotational period of Venus. 31.55815 Ms (365 d 6 h 9 min 10 s): The length of the true year, the orbital period of the Earth 126.2326 Ms (1461 d 0 h 34 min 40 s): The elected term of the President of the United States or one Olympiad
10^{9}	gigasecond	Gs	decades, centuries, millennia (1 Gs = over 31 years and 287 days = 1,000,000,000 s)	2.5 Gs: (79 a): The typical human life expectancy in the developed world 3.16 Gs: (100 a): One century 31.6 Gs: (1,000 a, 1 ka): One millennium, also called a kilo-annum (ka) 194.67 Gs (6.173 ka): The approximate lifespan of time capsule Crypt of Civilization, 28 May 1940 – 28 May 8113 363 Gs: (11.5 ka): The time since the beginning of the Holocene epoch 814 Gs: (25.8 ka): The approximate time for the cycle of precession of the Earth's axis
10^{12}	terasecond	Ts	millennia to geological epochs (1 Ts = over 31,600 years = 1,000,000,000,000 s)	3.1 Ts (100 ka): approximate length of a glacial period of the current Quaternary glaciation epoch 31.6 Ts (1000 ka, 1 Ma): One mega-annum (Ma), or one million years 79 Ts (2.5 Ma): The approximate time since earliest hominids of genus Australopithecus 130 Ts (4 Ma): The typical lifetime of a biological species on Earth 137 Ts (4.32 Ma): The length of the mythic unit of mahayuga, the Great Age, in Hindu mythology.
10^{15}	petasecond	Ps	geological eras, history of Earth and the Universe	2 Ps (66 Ma): The approximate time since the Cretaceous-Paleogene extinction event, believed to be caused by the impact of a large asteroid into Chicxulub in modern-day Mexico. This extinction was one of the largest in Earth's history and marked the demise of most dinosaurs, with the only known exception being the ancestors of today's birds. 7.9 Ps (250 Ma): The approximate time since the Permian-Triassic extinction event, the largest known mass extinction in Earth's history which wiped out 95% of all extant species and believed to have been caused by the consequences of massive long-term volcanic eruptions in the area of the Siberian Traps. Also, the approximate time to the supercontinent of Pangaea. Also, the length of one galactic year or cosmic year, the time required for the Sun to complete one orbit around the Milky Way Galaxy. 16 Ps (510 Ma): The approximate time since the Cambrian explosion, a massive evolutionary diversification of life which led to the appearance of most existing multicellular organisms and the replacement of the previous Ediacaran biota. 22 Ps (704 Ma): The approximate half-life of the uranium isotope ^{235}U. 31.6 Ps (1000 Ma, 1 Ga): One giga-annum (Ga), one billion years, the largest fixed time unit used in the standard geological time scale, approximately the order of magnitude of an eon, the largest division of geological time. +1 Ga: The estimated remaining habitable lifetime of Earth, according to some models. At this point in time the stellar evolution of the Sun will have increased its luminosity to the point that enough energy will be reaching the Earth to cause the evaporation of the oceans and their loss into space (due to the UV flux from the Sun at the top of the atmosphere dissociating the molecules), making it impossible for any life to continue. 136 Ps (4.32 Ga): The length of the legendary unit Kalpa in Hindu mythology, or one day (but not including the following night) of the life of Brahma. 143 Ps (4.5 Ga): The age of the Earth by our best estimates. Also the approximate half-life of the uranium isotope ^{238}U. 315 Ps (10 Ga): The approximate lifetime of a main-sequence star similar to the Sun. 434.8 Ps (13.787 Ga): The approximate age of the Universe
10^{18}	exasecond	Es	future cosmological time	All times of this length and beyond are currently theoretical as they surpass the elapsed lifetime of the known universe. 1.08 Es (+34 Ga): Time to the Big Rip according to some models, but this is not favored by existing data. This is one possible scenario for the ultimate fate of the Universe. Under this scenario, dark energy increases in strength and power in a feedback loop that eventually results in the tearing apart of all matter down to subatomic scale due to the rapidly increasing negative pressure thereupon 30 Es (1000 Ga, 1 Ta): One tera-annum (Ta), one trillion years 300 – 600 Es (10 – 20 Ta): The estimated lifetime of low-mass stars (red dwarfs)
10^{21}	zettasecond	Zs		3 Zs (+100 Ta): The remaining time until the end of Stelliferous Era of the universe, under the heat death scenario for the ultimate fate of the Universe, which is the most commonly accepted model in the current scientific community. This is marked by the cooling-off of the last low-mass dwarf star to a black dwarf. After this time has elapsed, the Degenerate Era begins. 9.85 Zs (311 Ta): The entire lifetime of Brahma in Hindu mythology.
10^{24}	yottasecond	Ys		600 Ys (2×10^{19} a): The radioactive half-life of bismuth-209 by alpha decay, one of the slowest-observed radioactive decay processes.
10^{27}	ronnasecond	Rs		3.16 Rs (1×10^{20} a): The estimated time until all stars are ejected from their galaxies or consumed by black holes. 32 Rs (1×10^{21} a): Highest estimate of the time until all stars are ejected from galaxies or consumed by black holes.
10^{30} and onward	quettasecond and beyond	Qs and on		69 Qs (2.2×10^{24} a): The radioactive half-life of tellurium-128, the longest known half-life of any elemental isotope. 1,340,009 Qs (4.134105×10^{28} years): The time period equivalent to the value of 13.13.13.13.13.13.13.13.13.13.13.13.13.13.13.13.13.13.13.13.0.0.0.0 in the Mesoamerican Long Count, a date discovered on a stele at the Coba Maya site, believed by archaeologist Linda Schele to be the absolute value for the length of one cycle of the universe 2.6×10^{11} Qs (8.2×10^{33} years): The smallest possible value for proton half-life consistent with experiment 10^{23} Qs (3.2×10^{45} years): The largest possible value for the proton half-life, assuming that the Big Bang was inflationary and that the same process that made baryons predominate over antibaryons in the early Universe also makes protons decay 6×10^{43} Qs (2×10^{66} years): The approximate lifespan of a black hole with the mass of the Sun 4×10^{63} Qs (1.3×10^{86} years): The approximate lifespan of Sagittarius A*, if uncharged and non-rotating 5.4×10^{83} Qs (1.7×10^{106} years): The approximate lifespan of a supermassive black hole with a mass of 20 trillion solar masses $10^{1500}$ Qs: Estimated time for iron star formation if protons do not decay. $10^{10^{10^{76.66}}}$ Qs: The scale of an estimated Poincaré recurrence time for the quantum state of a hypothetical box containing an isolated black hole of stellar mass This time assumes a statistical model subject to Poincaré recurrence. A much simplified way of thinking about this time is that in a model in which history repeats itself arbitrarily many times due to properties of statistical mechanics, this is the time scale when it will first be somewhat similar (for a reasonable choice of "similar") to its current state again. $10^{10^{10^{123}}}$Qs: The scale of an estimated Poincaré recurrence time for the quantum state of a hypothetical box containing a black hole with the mass of the observable Universe. ${10}^{{10}^{{10}^{{10}^{{10}^{1.1}}}}}$ Qs (${10}^{{10}^{{10}^{3,883,775,501,690}}}$ years): The scale of an estimated Poincaré recurrence time for the quantum state of a hypothetical box containing a black hole with the estimated mass of the entire Universe, observable or not, assuming Linde's Chaotic Inflationary model with an inflaton whose mass is 10^{−6} Planck masses.

Other
Multiples	Unit	Symbol
6×10^{1} seconds	1 minute	min
6×10^{1} minutes	1 hour	h (hr)
2.4×10^{1} hours	1 day	d

== See also ==
- Geologic time scale
- International System of Units
- Orders of magnitude (frequency)
- Planck units
- Scale (analytical tool)
- Temporal resolution
- Timeline of the far future
- Year
