= Applications of radio =

Uses of radio and radio waves

Radio (the general technology of communicating using radio waves) has many practical applications, which include broadcasting, voice communication, data communication, radar, radiolocation, medical treatments, and remote control.

== Broadcasting ==
Broadcasting is the one-way transmission of information from a transmitter to receivers belonging to a public audience. Since the radio waves become weaker with distance, a broadcasting station can only be received within a limited distance of its transmitter. Systems that broadcast from satellites can generally be received over an entire country or continent. Older terrestrial radio and television are paid for by commercial advertising or governments. In subscription systems like satellite television and satellite radio the customer pays a monthly fee. In these systems, the radio signal is encrypted and can only be decrypted by the receiver, which is controlled by the company and can be deactivated if the customer does not pay.

Broadcasting uses several parts of the radio spectrum, depending on the type of signals transmitted and the desired target audience. Longwave and medium wave signals can give reliable coverage of areas several hundred kilometers across, but have a more limited information-carrying capacity and so work best with audio signals (speech and music), and the sound quality can be degraded by radio noise from natural and artificial sources. The shortwave bands have a greater potential range but are more subject to interference by distant stations and varying atmospheric conditions that affect reception.

In the very high frequency band, greater than 30 megahertz, the Earth's atmosphere has less of an effect on the range of signals, and line-of-sight propagation becomes the principal mode. These higher frequencies permit the great bandwidth required for television broadcasting. Since natural and artificial noise sources are less present at these frequencies, high-quality audio transmission is possible, using frequency modulation.

=== Audio: Radio broadcasting ===
Radio broadcasting means transmission of audio (sound) to radio receivers belonging to a public audience. Analog audio is the earliest form of radio broadcast. AM broadcasting began around 1920. FM broadcasting was introduced in the late 1930s with improved fidelity. A broadcast radio receiver is called a radio. Most radios can receive both AM and FM.

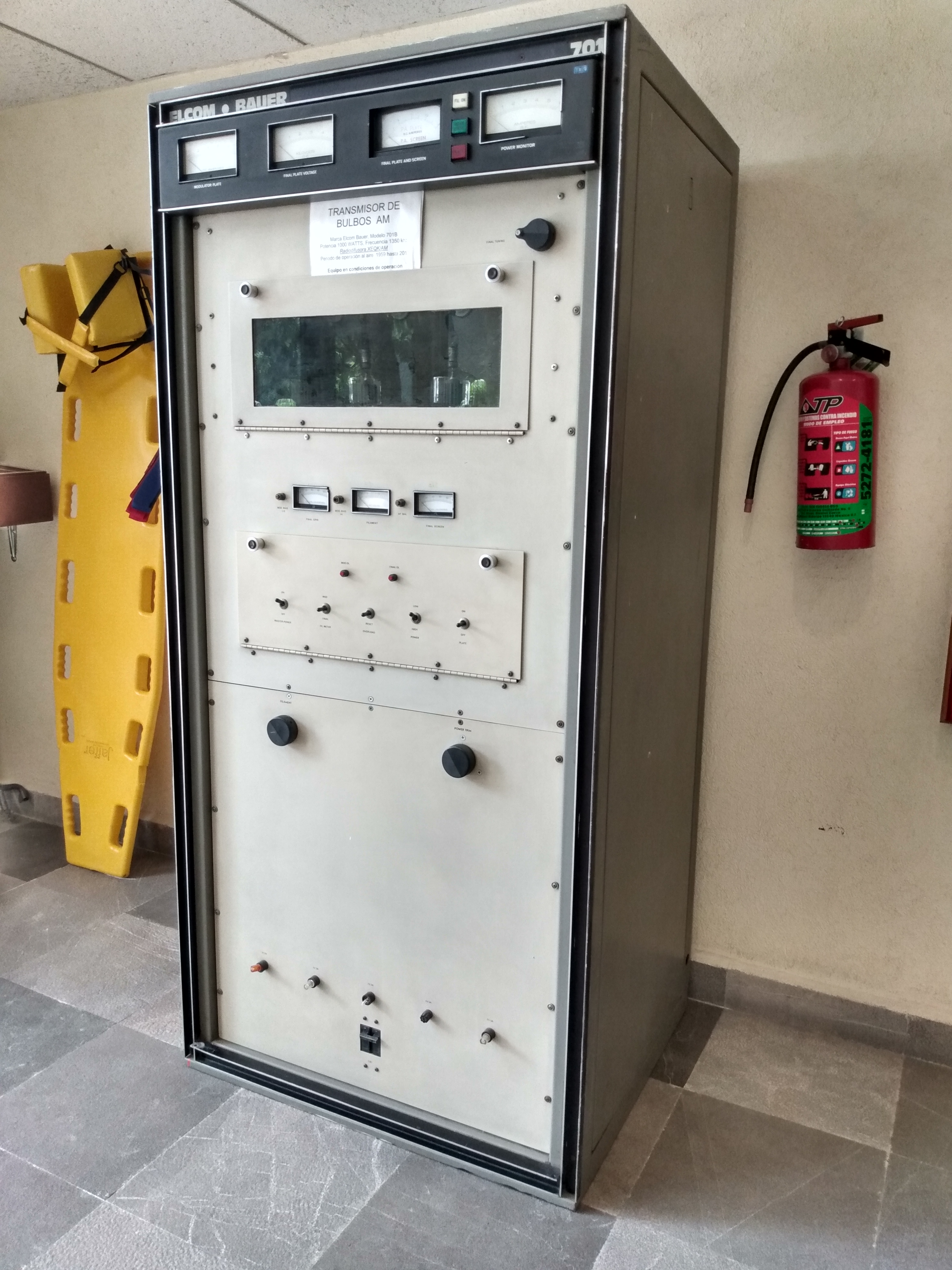
1100 W AM broadcasting transmitter

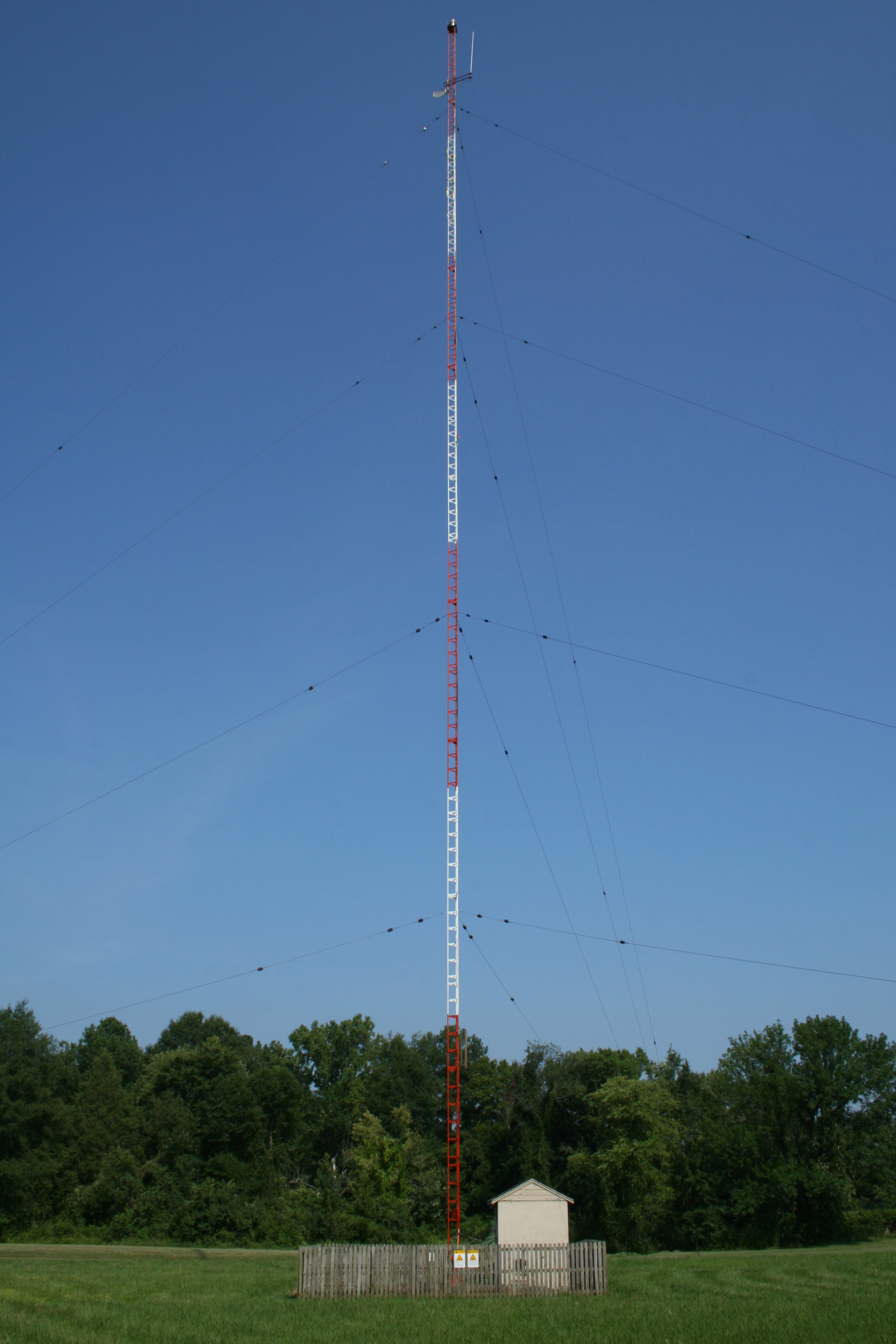
Mast radiator antenna of AM radio station

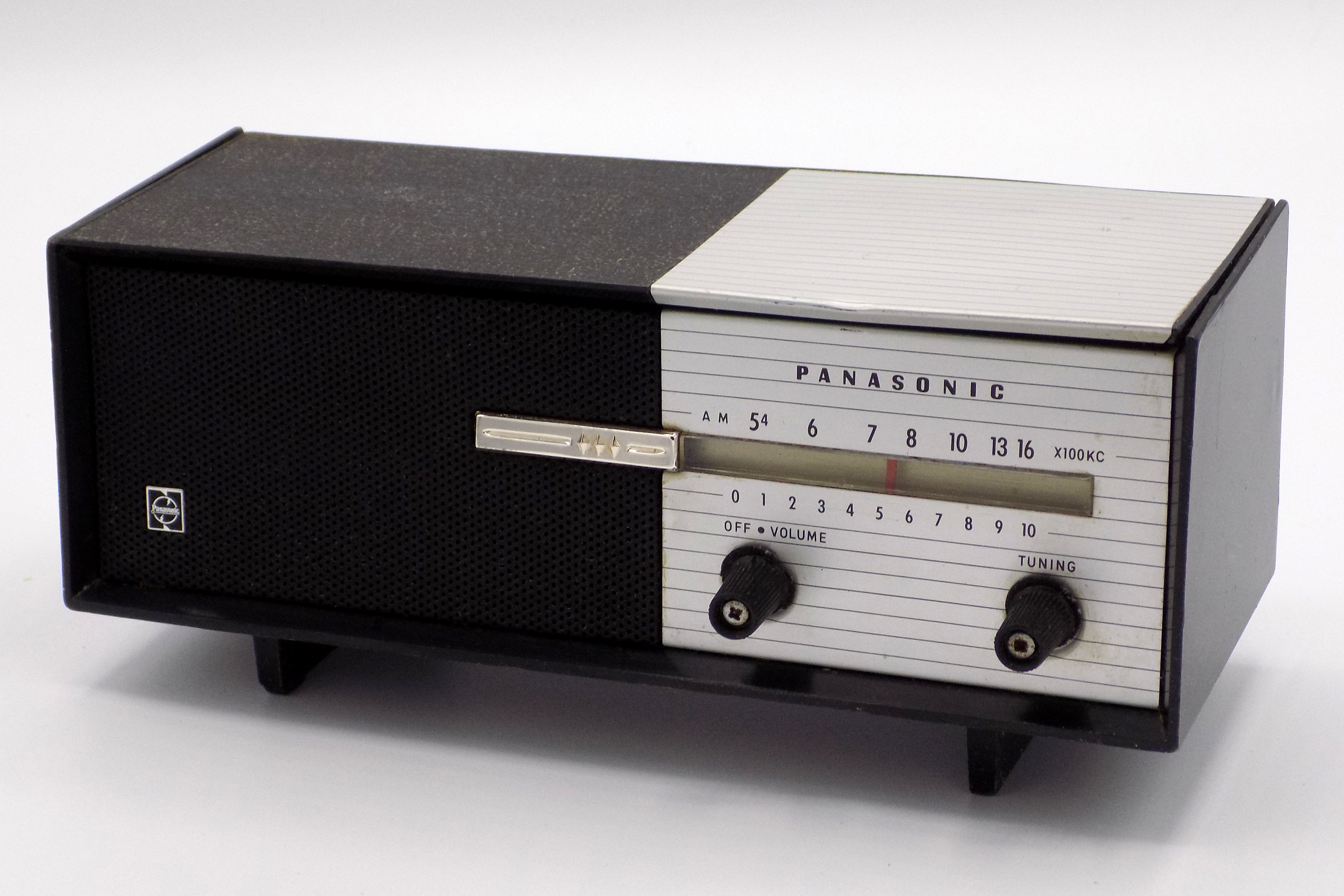
Panasonic AM radio from 1964

- AM (amplitude modulation) – in AM, the amplitude (strength) of the radio carrier wave is varied by the audio signal. AM broadcasting, the oldest broadcasting technology, is allowed in the AM broadcast bands, between 148 and 283 kHz in the low frequency (LF) band for longwave broadcasts and between 526 and 1706 kHz in the medium frequency (MF) band for medium-wave broadcasts. Because waves in these bands travel as ground waves following the terrain, AM radio stations can be received beyond the horizon at hundreds of miles distance, but AM has lower fidelity than FM. Radiated power (ERP) of AM stations in the US is usually limited to a maximum of 10 kW, although a few (clear-channel stations) are allowed to transmit at 50 kW. AM stations broadcast in monaural audio; AM stereo broadcast standards exist in most countries, but the radio industry has failed to upgrade to them, due to lack of demand.

- Shortwave broadcasting – AM broadcasting is also allowed in the shortwave bands by legacy radio stations at 3 – 30 MHz. Since radio waves in these bands can travel intercontinental distances by reflecting off the ionosphere using skywave or "skip" propagation, shortwave is used by international stations, broadcasting to other countries.

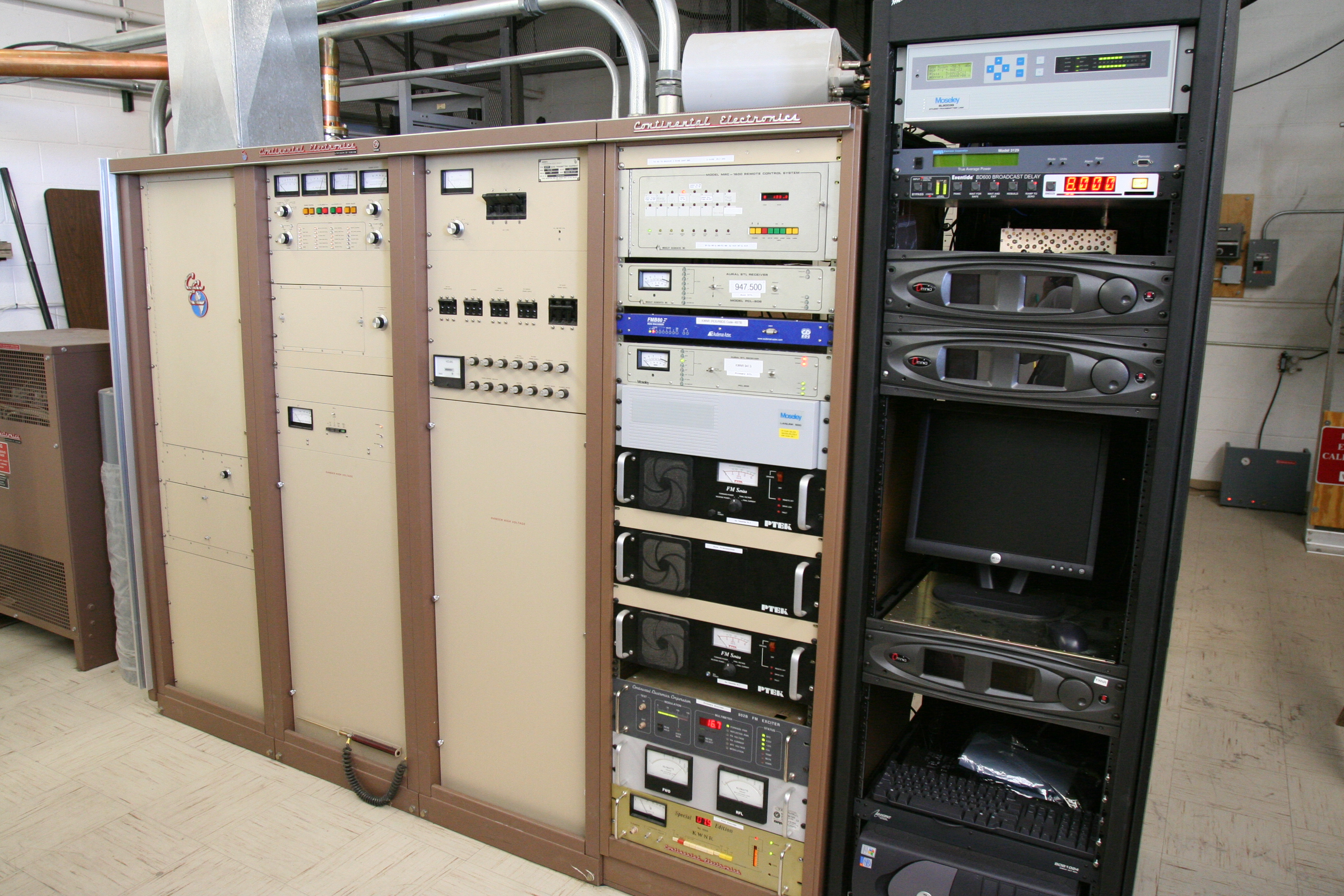
FM broadcast transmitter of radio station KWNR, Las Vegas, with a power of 35 kW on 95.5 MHz

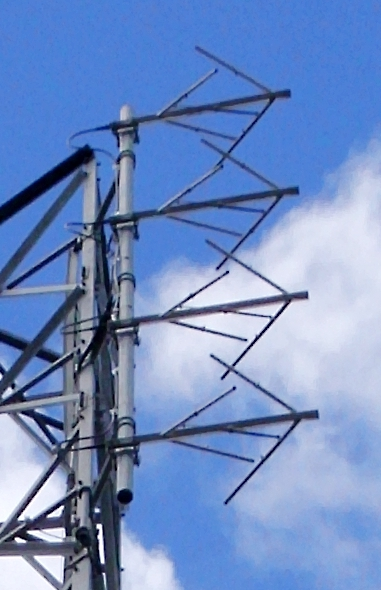
FM broadcasting antenna

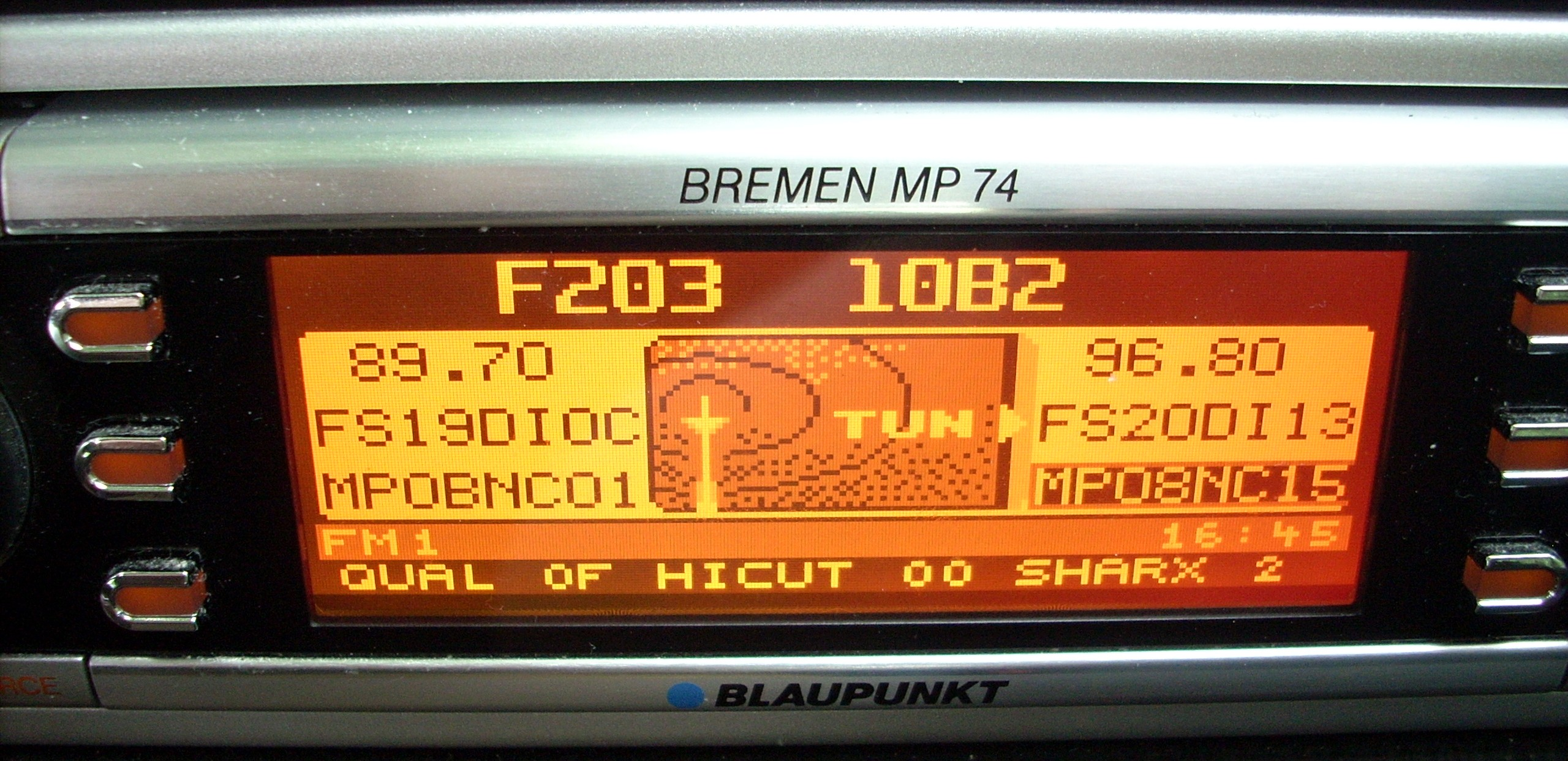
FM car radio's interface display

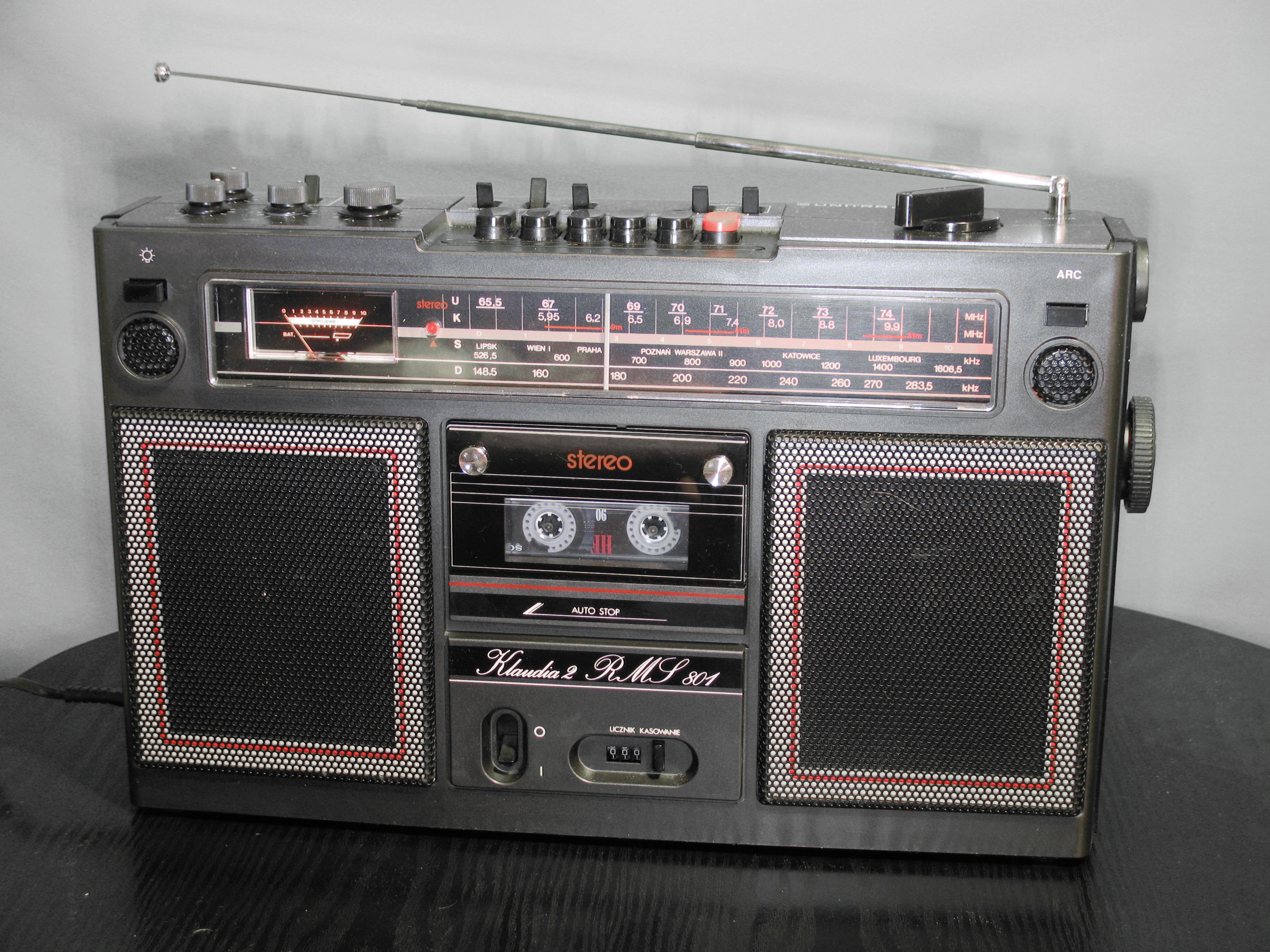
AM/FM boombox radio with FM whip antenna

- FM (frequency modulation) – in FM the frequency of the radio carrier signal is varied slightly by the audio signal. FM broadcasting is permitted in the FM broadcast bands between about 65 and 108 MHz in the very high frequency (VHF) range. Radio waves in this band travel by line-of-sight so FM reception is limited by the visual horizon to about 30–40 miles (48–64 km), and can be blocked by hills. However it is less susceptible to interference from radio noise (RFI, sferics, static), and has higher fidelity, better frequency response, and less audio distortion than AM. In the US, radiated power (ERP) of FM stations varies from 6–100 kW.
- Digital radio involves a variety of standards and technologies for broadcasting digital radio signals over the air. Some systems, such as HD Radio and DRM, operate in the same wavebands as analog broadcasts, either as a replacement for analog stations or as a complementary service. Others, such as DAB/DAB+ and ISDB_Tsb, operate in wavebands traditionally used for television or satellite services.

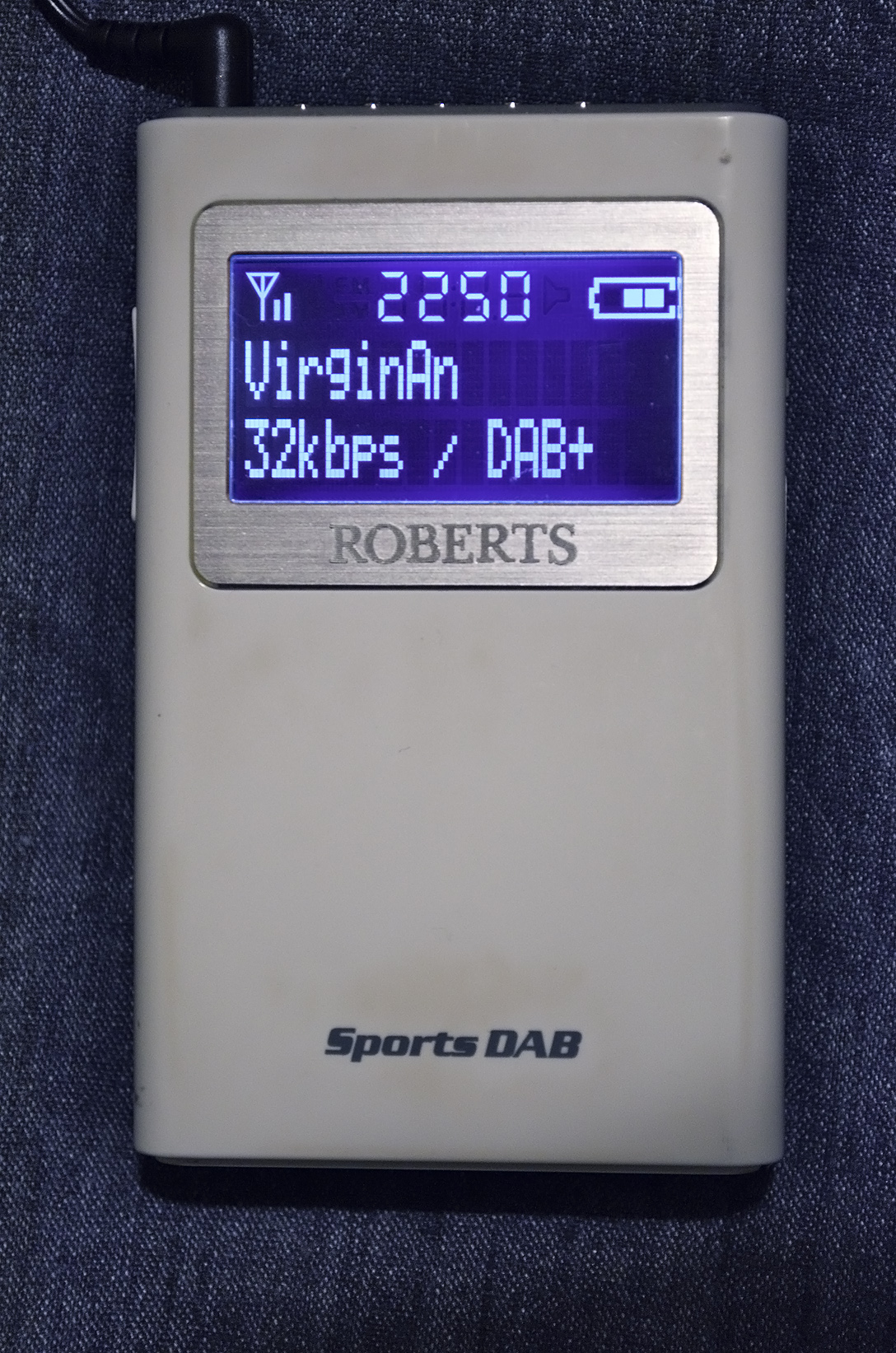
"Roberts" radio for DAB

- Digital Audio Broadcasting (DAB) debuted in some countries in 1998. It transmits audio as a digital signal rather than an analog signal as AM and FM do. DAB has the potential to provide higher quality sound than FM (although many stations do not choose to transmit at such high quality), has greater immunity to radio noise and interference, makes better use of scarce radio spectrum bandwidth and provides advanced user features such as electronic program guides. Its disadvantage is that it is incompatible with previous radios so that a new DAB receiver must be purchased. Several nations have set dates to switch off analog FM networks in favor of DAB / DAB+, notably Norway in 2017 and Switzerland in 2024.

A single DAB station transmits a 1,500 kHz bandwidth signal that carries from 9–12 channels of digital audio modulated by OFDM from which the listener can choose. Broadcasters can transmit a channel at a range of different bit rates, so different channels can have different audio quality. In different countries DAB stations broadcast in either Band III (174–240 MHz) or L band (1.452–1.492 GHz) in the UHF range, so like FM reception is limited by the visual horizon to about 40 miles (64 km).

- HD Radio is an alternative digital radio standard widely implemented in North America. An in-band on-channel technology, HD Radio broadcasts a digital signal in a subcarrier of a station's analog FM or AM signal. Stations are able to multicast more than one audio signal in the subcarrier, supporting the transmission of multiple audio services at varying bitrates. The digital signal is transmitted using OFDM with the HDC (High-Definition Coding) proprietary audio compression format. HDC is based on, but not compatible with, the MPEG-4 standard HE-AAC. It uses a modified discrete cosine transform (MDCT) audio data compression algorithm.

- Digital Radio Mondiale (DRM) is a competing digital terrestrial radio standard developed mainly by broadcasters as a higher spectral efficiency replacement for legacy AM and FM broadcasting. Mondiale means "worldwide" in French and Italian; DRM was developed in 2001, and is currently supported by 23 countries, and adopted by some European and Eastern broadcasters beginning in 2003. The DRM30 mode uses the commercial broadcast bands below 30 MHz, and is intended as a replacement for standard AM broadcast on the longwave, mediumwave, and shortwave bands. The DRM+ mode uses VHF frequencies centered around the FM broadcast band, and is intended as a replacement for FM broadcasting. It is incompatible with existing radio receivers, so it requires listeners to purchase a new DRM receiver. The modulation used is a form of OFDM called COFDM in which, up to 4 carriers are transmitted on a channel formerly occupied by a single AM or FM signal, modulated by quadrature amplitude modulation (QAM).

The DRM system is designed to be as compatible as possible with existing AM and FM radio transmitters, so that much of the equipment in existing radio stations can continue in use, augmented with DRM modulation equipment.

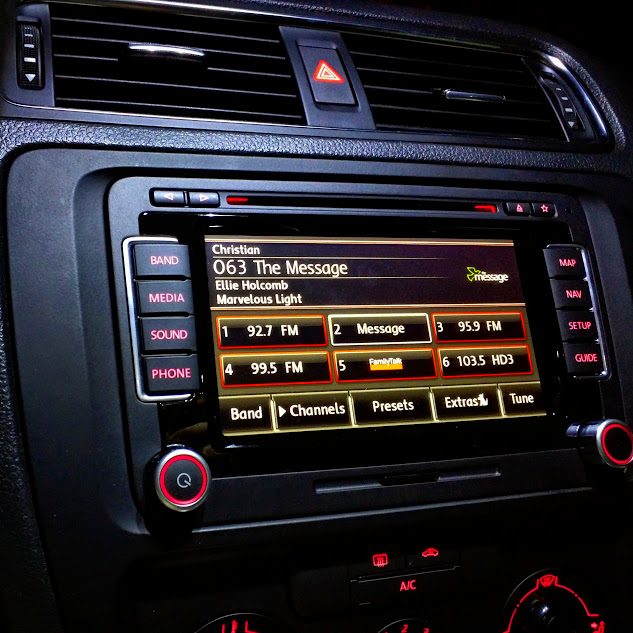
Volkswagen's RNS-510 receiver supports Sirius Satellite Radio.

- Satellite radio is a subscription radio service that broadcasts CD quality digital audio direct to subscribers' receivers using a microwave downlink signal from a direct broadcast communication satellite in geostationary orbit 22,000 miles (35,000 km) above the Earth. It is mostly intended for radios in vehicles. Satellite radio uses the 2.3 GHz S band in North America, in other parts of the world, it uses the 1.4 GHz L band allocated for DAB.

=== Industrial, scientific, medical ===
The ISM bands were initially reserved for non-communications uses of RF energy, such as microwave ovens, radio-frequency heating, and similar purposes. However, in recent years the largest use of these bands has been by short-range low-power communications systems, since users do not have to hold a radio operator's license. Cordless telephones, wireless computer networks, Bluetooth devices, and garage door openers all use the ISM bands. ISM devices do not have regulatory protection against interference from other users of the band.

=== Audio/video: Television broadcasting ===
Television broadcasting is the transmission of moving images along with a synchronized audio (sound) channel by radio. The sequence of still images is displayed on a screen on a television receiver (a "television" or TV), which includes a loudspeaker. Television (video) signals occupy a wider bandwidth than broadcast radio (audio) signals. Analog television, the original television technology, required 6 MHz, so the television frequency bands are divided into 6 MHz channels, now called "RF channels".

Designations for television and FM radio broadcast frequencies vary between countries, see Television channel frequencies and FM broadcast band. Since VHF and UHF frequencies are desirable for many uses in urban areas, in North America some parts of the former television broadcasting band have been reassigned to cellular phone and various land mobile communications systems. Even within the allocation still dedicated to television, TV-band devices use channels without local broadcasters.

The Apex band in the United States was a pre-WWII allocation for VHF audio broadcasting; it was made obsolete after the introduction of FM broadcasting.

The current television standard, introduced beginning in 1998, is a digital format called high-definition television (HDTV), which transmits pictures at higher resolution, typically 1080 pixels high by 1920 pixels wide, at a rate of 50 or 60 interlaced fields/progressive frames per second. Digital television (DTV) transmission systems, which replaced older analog television in a transition beginning in 2006, use image compression and high-efficiency digital modulation such as OFDM and 8VSB to transmit HDTV video within a smaller bandwidth than the old analog channels, saving scarce radio spectrum space. Therefore, each of the 6 MHz analog RF channels now carries up to 7 DTV channels – these are called "virtual channels". Digital television receivers have different behavior in the presence of poor reception or noise than analog television, called the "digital cliff" effect. Unlike analog television, in which increasingly poor reception causes the picture quality to gradually degrade, in digital television picture quality is not affected by poor reception until, at a certain point, the receiver stops working and the screen goes black.

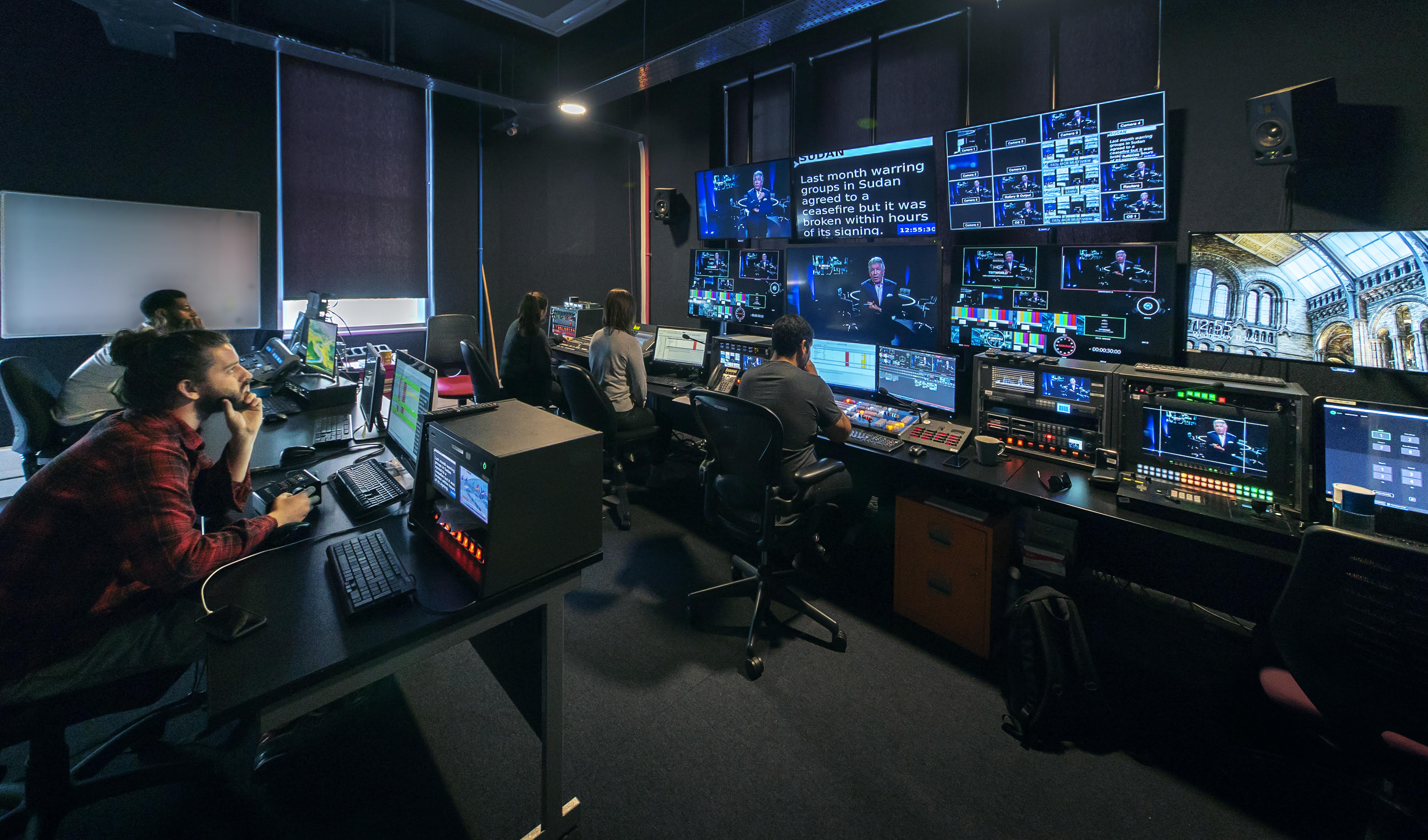
Television studio control room, Celebro Studios, London

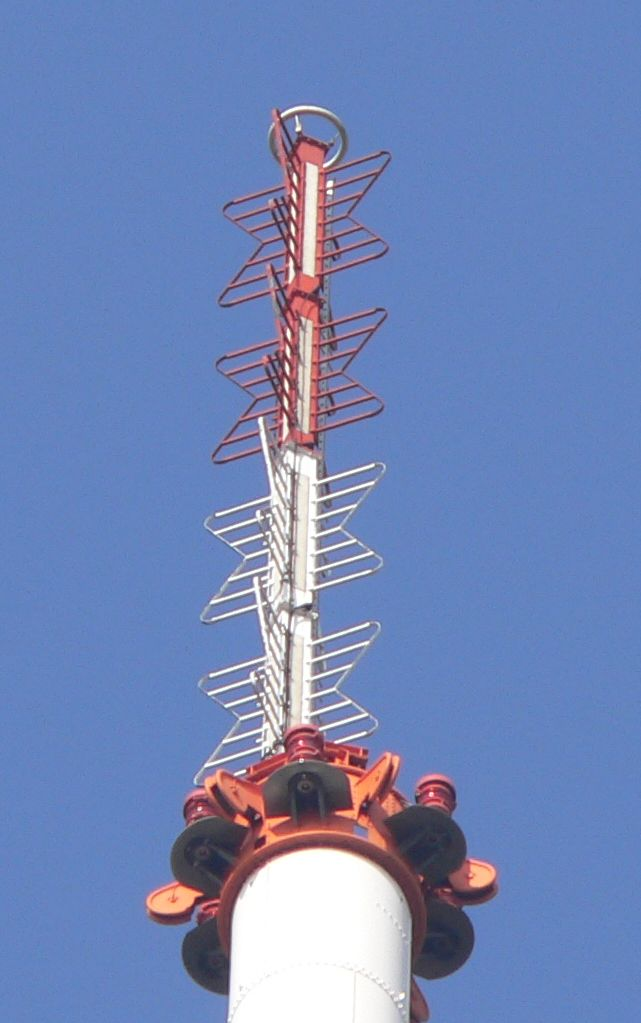
A television broadcasting antenna

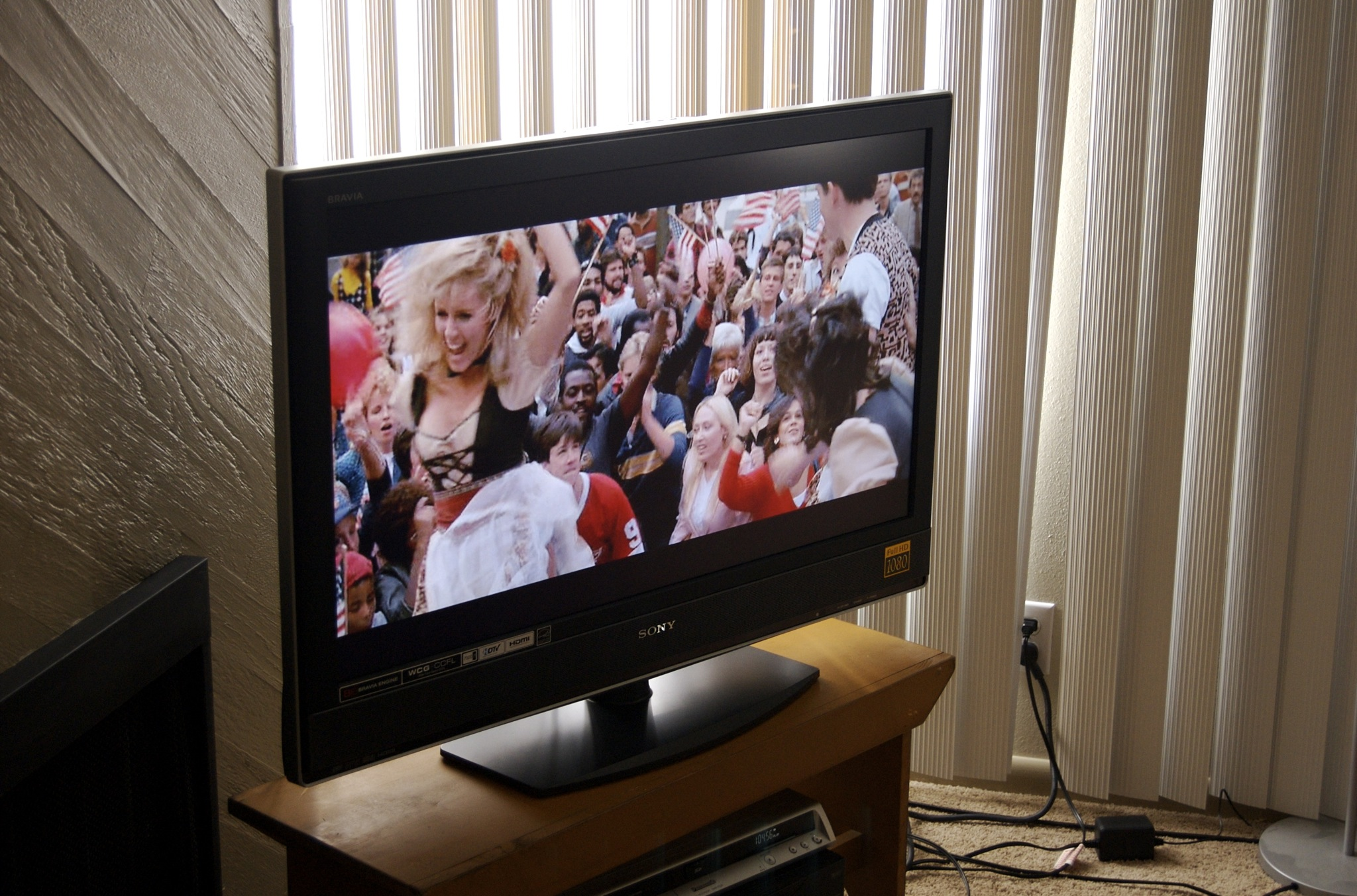
A modern flatscreen television receiver

- Terrestrial television, over-the-air (OTA) television, or broadcast television – the oldest television technology, is the transmission of television signals from land-based television stations to television receivers (called televisions or TVs) in viewer's homes. Terrestrial television broadcasting uses the bands 41 – 88 MHz (VHF low band or Band I, carrying RF channels 1–6), 174 – 240 MHz, (VHF high band or Band III; carrying RF channels 7–13), and 470 – 614 MHz (UHF Band IV and Band V; carrying RF channels 14 and up). The exact frequency boundaries vary in different countries. Propagation is by line-of-sight, so reception is limited by the visual horizon. In the US, the effective radiated power (ERP) of television transmitters is regulated according to height above average terrain. Viewers closer to the television transmitter can use a simple "rabbit ears" dipole antenna on top of the TV, but viewers in fringe reception areas typically require an outdoor antenna mounted on the roof to get adequate reception.
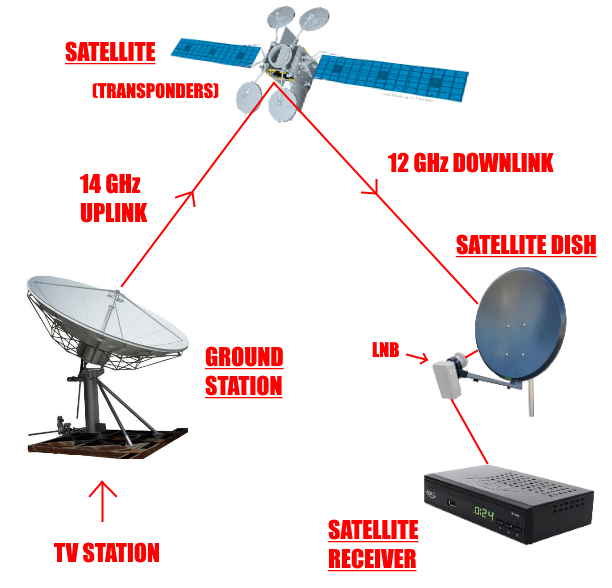
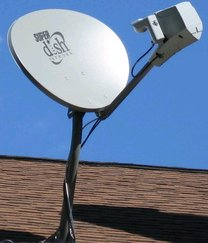
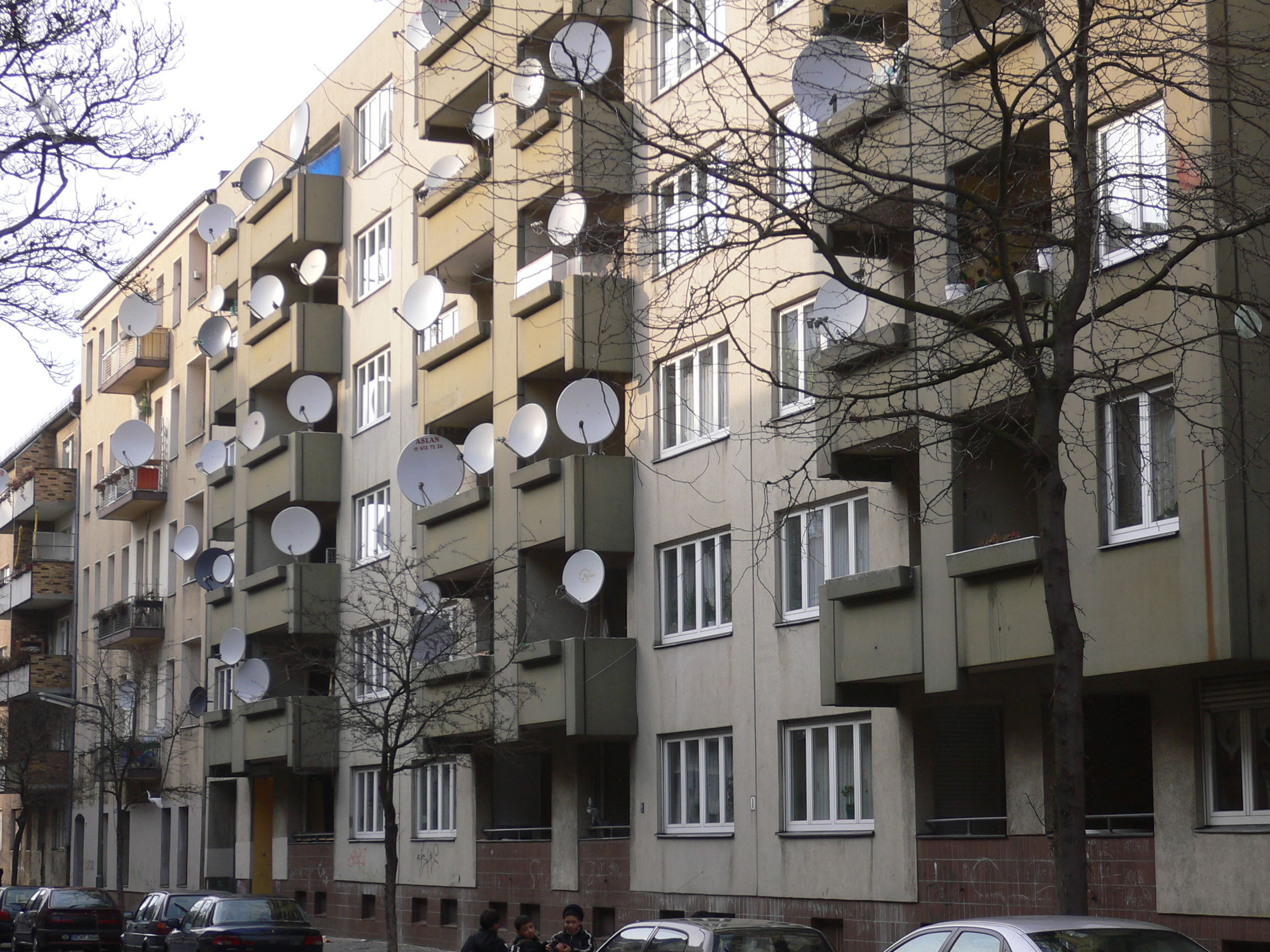
(left) Diagram showing how a satellite television network works. (center) DISH Network's Super Dish 121 mounted on a rooftop. (right) A residential tower block with TV satellite dishes
- Satellite television – a set-top box which receives subscription direct-broadcast satellite television, and displays it on an ordinary television. A direct broadcast satellite in geostationary orbit 22,200 miles (35,700 km) above the Earth's equator transmits many channels (up to 900) modulated on a 12.2 to 12.7 GHz K_{u} band microwave downlink signal to a rooftop satellite dish antenna on the subscriber's residence. The microwave signal is converted to a lower intermediate frequency at the dish and conducted into the building by a coaxial cable to a set-top box connected to the subscriber's TV, where it is demodulated and displayed. The subscriber pays a monthly fee.

=== Time and frequency ===
Government standard frequency and time signal services operate time radio stations which continuously broadcast extremely accurate time signals produced by atomic clocks, as a reference to synchronize other clocks. Examples are BPC, DCF77, JJY, MSF, RTZ, TDF, WWV, and YVTO. One use is in radio clocks and watches, which include an automated receiver that periodically (usually weekly) receives and decodes the time signal and resets the watch's internal quartz clock to the correct time, thus allowing a small watch or desk clock to have the same accuracy as an atomic clock. Government time stations are declining in number because GPS satellites and the Internet Network Time Protocol (NTP) provide equally accurate time standards.

=== Citizens' band and personal radio services ===
Citizens' band radio is allocated in many countries, using channelized radios in the upper HF part of the spectrum (around 27 MHz). It is used for personal, small business and hobby purposes. Other frequency allocations are used for similar services in different jurisdictions, for example UHF CB is allocated in Australia. A wide range of personal radio services exist around the world, usually emphasizing short-range communication between individuals or for small businesses, simplified license requirements or in some countries covered by a class license, and usually FM transceivers using around 1 watt or less.

== Voice communication ==
=== Two-way voice communication ===
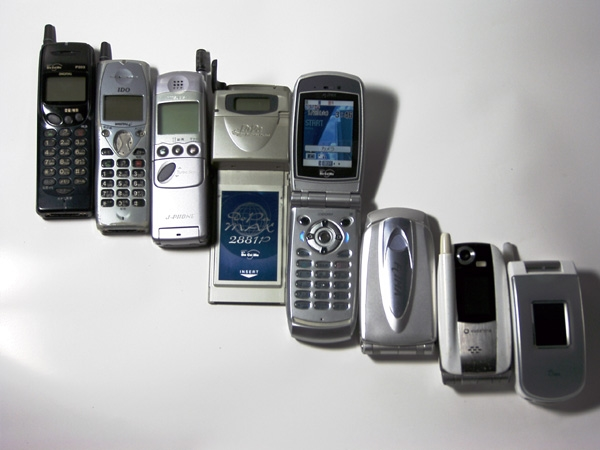
Cellphones typical of Japan in the early 21st century.

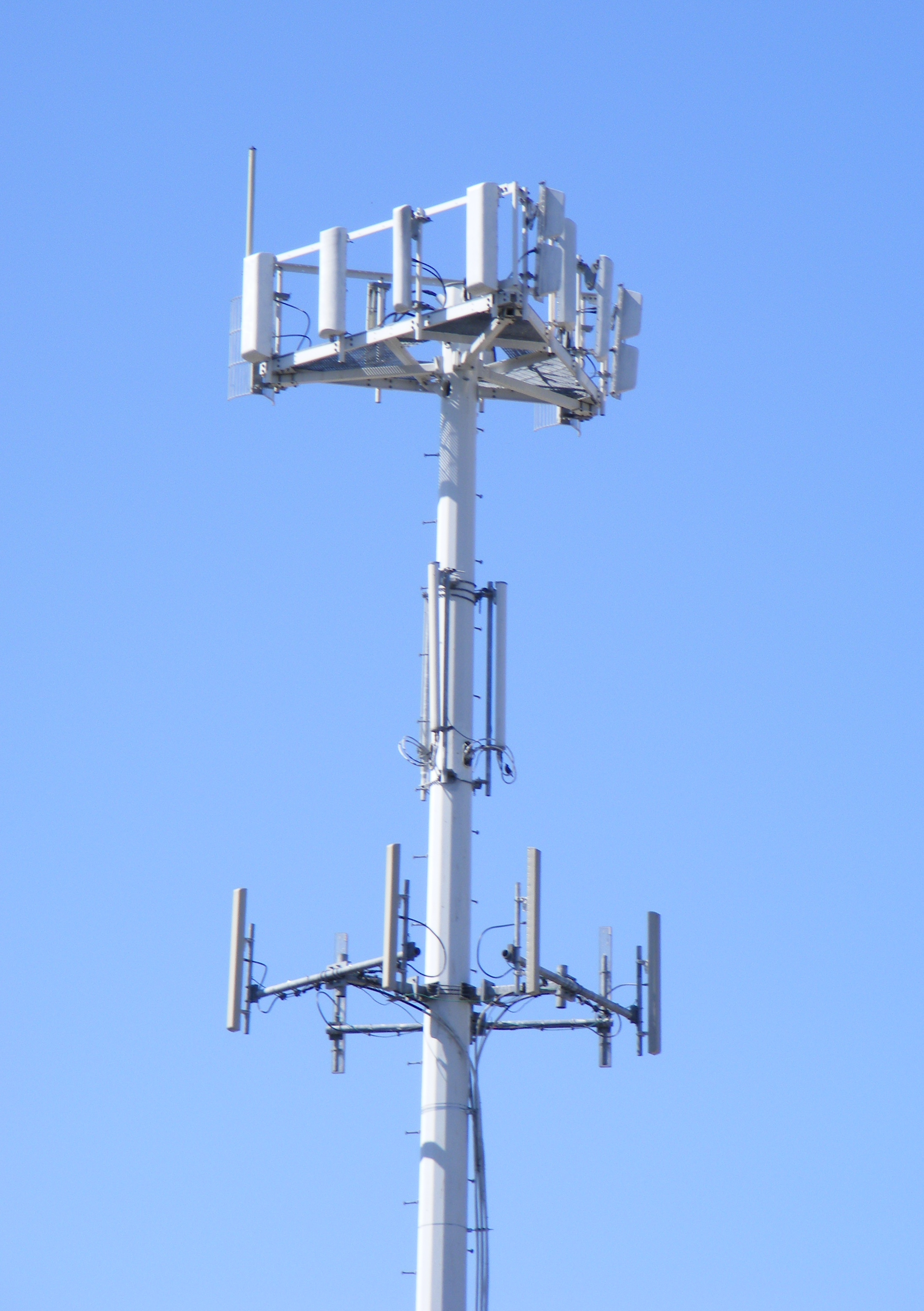
Cellular phone tower shared by antennas belonging to 3 different networks.

A two-way radio is an audio transceiver, a receiver and transmitter in the same device, used for bidirectional person-to-person voice communication with other users with similar radios. An older term for this mode of communication is radiotelephony. The radio link may be half-duplex, as in a walkie-talkie, using a single radio channel in which only one radio can transmit at a time, so different users take turns talking, pressing a "push to talk" button on their radio which switches off the receiver and switches on the transmitter. Or the radio link may be full duplex, a bidirectional link using two radio channels so both people can talk at the same time, as in a cell phone.

- Cell phone – a portable wireless telephone that is connected to the telephone network by radio signals exchanged with a local antenna at a cellular base station (cell tower). The service area covered by the provider is divided into small geographical areas called "cells", each served by a separate base station antenna and multichannel transceiver. All the cell phones in a cell communicate with this antenna on separate frequency channels, assigned from a common pool of frequencies. The purpose of cellular organization is to conserve radio bandwidth by frequency reuse. Low power transmitters are used so the radio waves used in a cell do not travel far beyond the cell, allowing the same frequencies to be reused in geographically separated cells. When a user carrying a cellphone crosses from one cell to another, his phone is automatically "handed off" seamlessly to the new antenna and assigned new frequencies. Cellphones have a highly automated full duplex digital transceiver using OFDM modulation using two digital radio channels, each carrying one direction of the bidirectional conversation, as well as a control channel that handles dialing calls and "handing off" the phone to another cell tower. Older 2G, 3G, and 4G networks use frequencies in the UHF and low microwave range, between 700 MHz and 3 GHz. The cell phone transmitter adjusts its power output to use the minimum power necessary to communicate with the cell tower; 0.6 W when near the tower, up to 3 W when farther away. Cell tower channel transmitter power is 50 W. Current generation phones, called smartphones, have many functions besides making telephone calls, and therefore have several other radio transmitters and receivers that connect them with other networks: usually a Wi-Fi modem, a Bluetooth modem, and a GPS receiver.
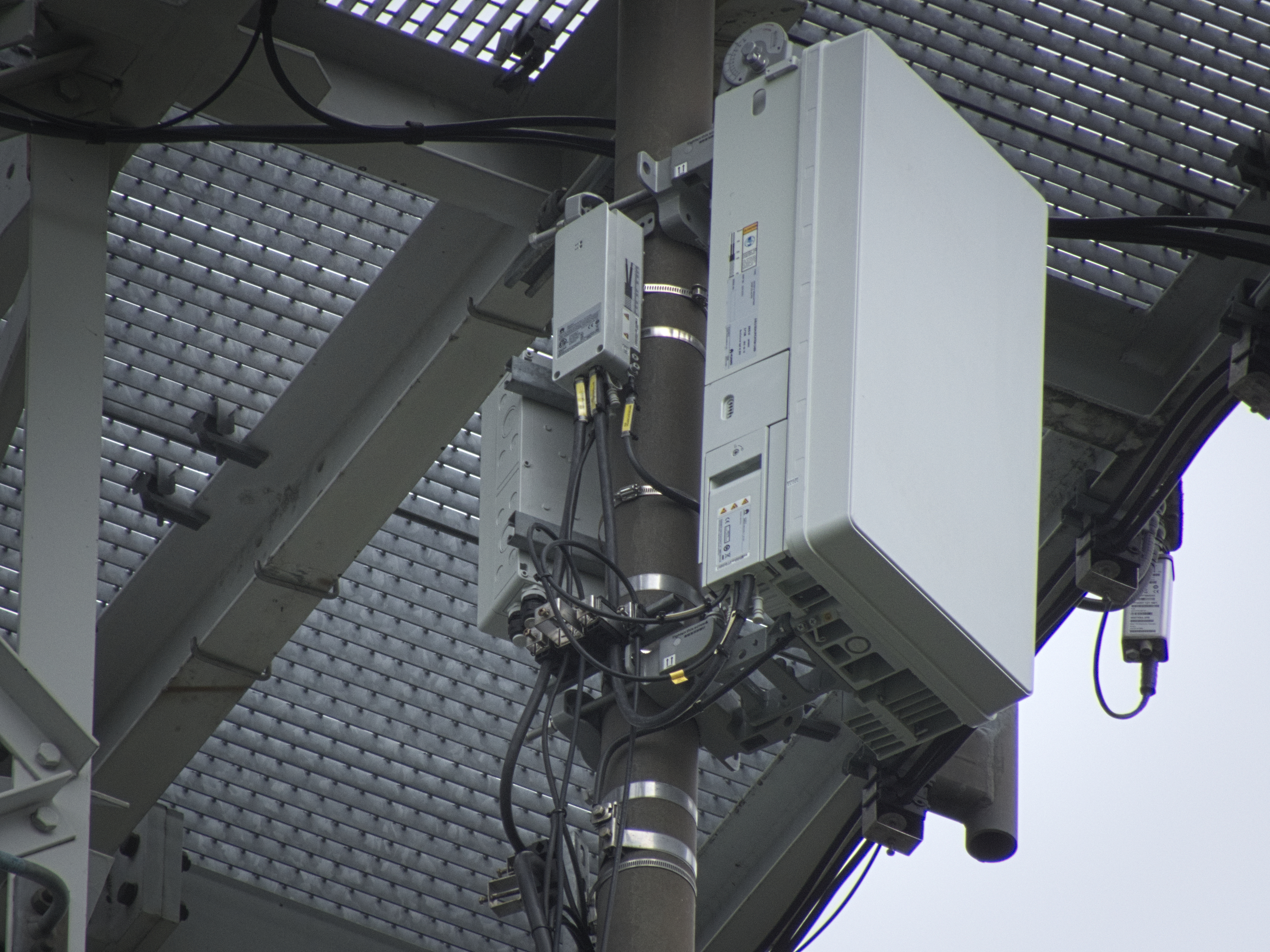
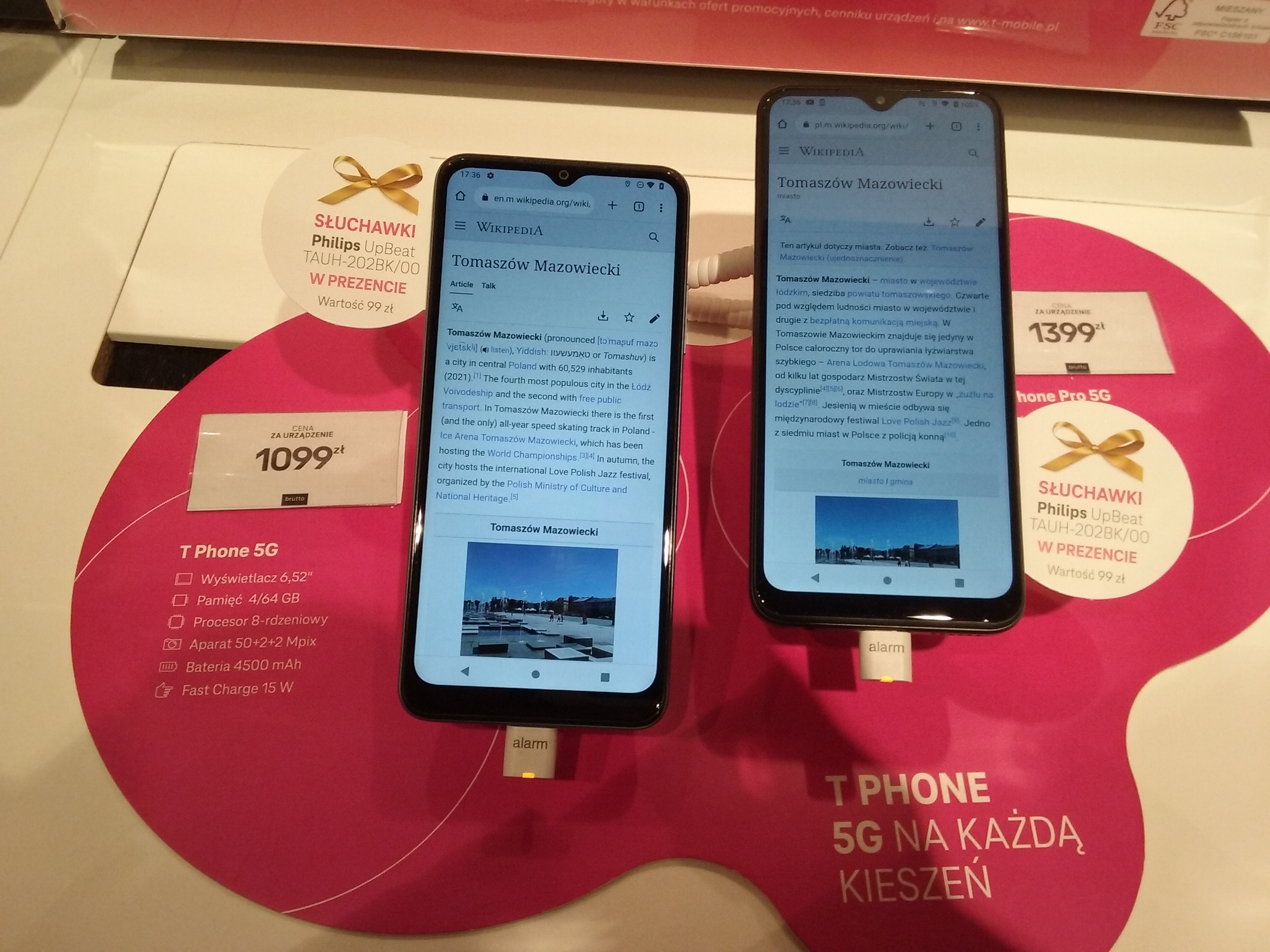
(left) 5G millimeter wave antenna, Germany (right) Polish 5G smartphones
- 5G cellular network – next-generation cellular networks which began deployment in 2019. Their major advantage is much higher data rates than previous cellular networks, up to 10 Gbps; 100 times faster than the previous cellular technology, 4G LTE. The higher data rates are achieved partly by using higher frequency radio waves, in the higher microwave band 3–6 GHz, and millimeter wave band, around 28 and 39 GHz. Since these frequencies have a shorter range than previous cellphone bands, the cells will be smaller than the cells in previous cellular networks which could be many miles across. Millimeter-wave cells will only be a few blocks long, and instead of a cell base station and antenna tower, they will have many small antennas attached to utility poles and buildings.

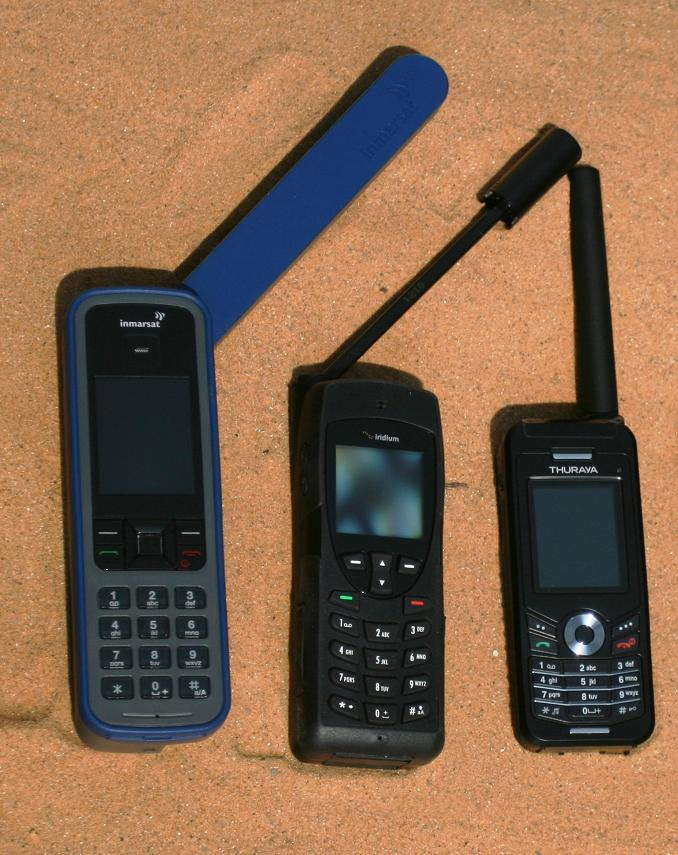
Satellite phones, showing the large antennas needed to communicate with the satellite

- Satellite phone (satphone) – a portable wireless telephone similar to a cell phone, connected to the telephone network through a radio link to an orbiting communications satellite instead of through cell towers. They are more expensive than cell phones; but their advantage is that, unlike a cell phone which is limited to areas covered by cell towers, satphones can be used over most or all of the geographical area of the Earth. In order for the phone to communicate with a satellite using a small omnidirectional antenna, first-generation systems use satellites in low Earth orbit, about 400–700 miles (640–1,100 km) above the surface. With an orbital period of about 100 minutes, a satellite can only be in view of a phone for about 4 – 15 minutes, so the call is "handed off" to another satellite when one passes beyond the local horizon. Therefore, large numbers of satellites, about 40 to 70, are required to ensure that at least one satellite is in view continuously from each point on Earth. Other satphone systems use satellites in geostationary orbit in which only a few satellites are needed, but these cannot be used at high latitudes because of terrestrial interference.
- Cordless phone – a landline telephone in which the handset is portable and communicates with the rest of the phone by a short-range full duplex radio link, instead of being attached by a cord. Both the handset and the base station have low-power radio transceivers that handle the short-range bidirectional radio link. As of 2022, cordless phones in most nations use the DECT transmission standard.

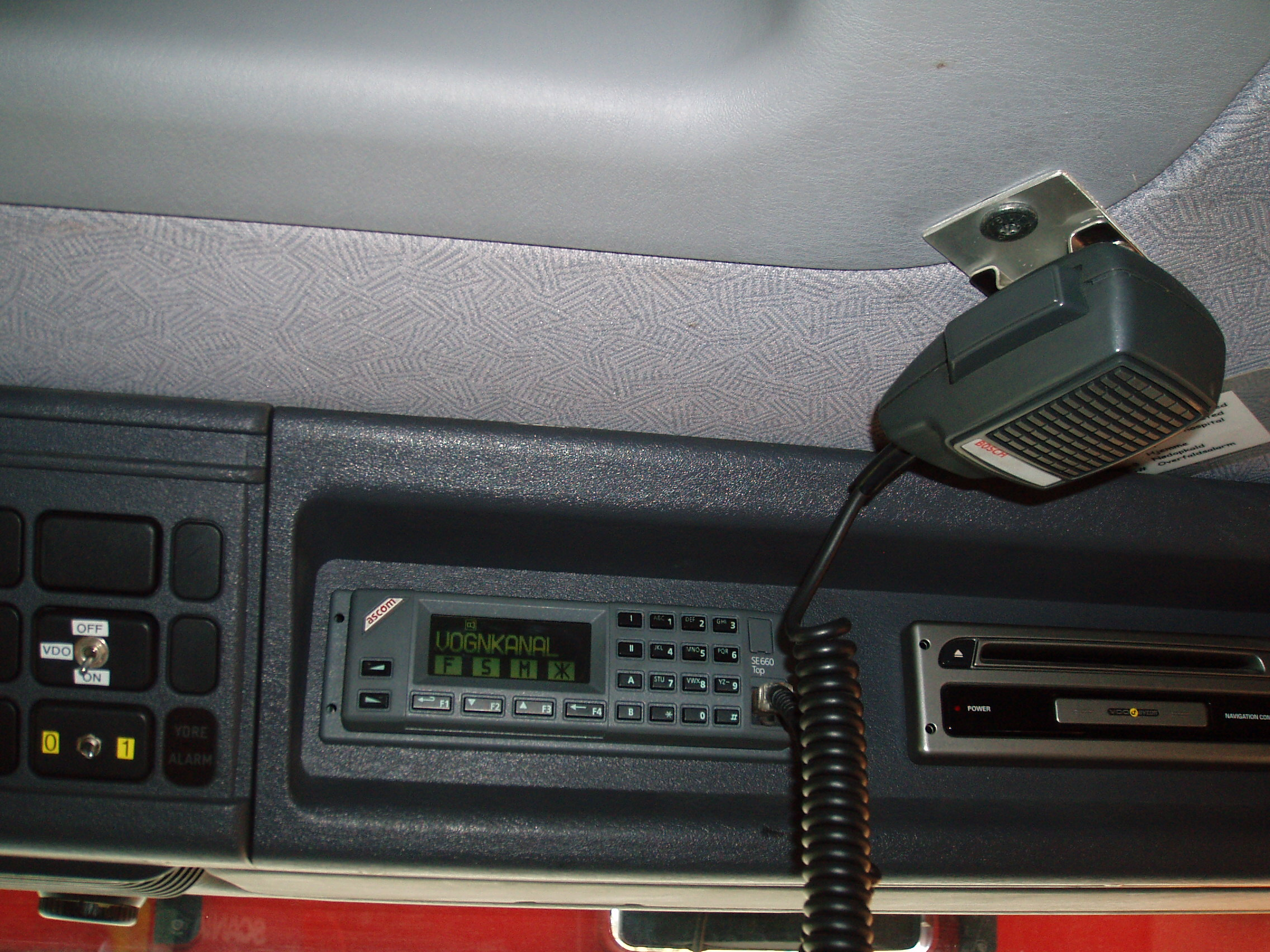
Two-way radio in a fire truck used by firefighters to communicate with their dispatcher

- Land mobile radio system – short-range mobile or portable half-duplex radio transceivers operating in the VHF or UHF band that can be used without a license. They are often installed in vehicles, with the mobile units communicating with a dispatcher at a fixed base station. Special systems with reserved frequencies are used by first responder services; police, fire, ambulance, and emergency services, and other government services. Other systems are made for use by commercial firms such as taxi and delivery services. VHF systems use channels in the range 30–50 MHz and 150–172 MHz. UHF systems use the 450–470 MHz band and in some areas the 470–512 MHz range. In general, VHF systems have a longer range than UHF but require longer antennas. AM or FM modulation is mainly used, but digital systems such as DMR are being introduced. The radiated power is typically limited to 4 watts. These systems have a fairly limited range, usually 3 to 20 miles (4.8 to 32 km) depending on terrain. Repeaters installed on tall buildings, hills, or mountain peaks are often used to increase the range when it is desired to cover a larger area than line-of-sight. Examples of land mobile systems are CB, FRS, GMRS, and MURS. Modern digital systems, called trunked radio systems, have a digital channel management system using a control channel that automatically assigns frequency channels to user groups.
- Walkie-talkie – a battery-powered portable handheld half-duplex two-way radio, used in land mobile radio systems.
- Airband – Half-duplex radio system used by aircraft pilots to talk to other aircraft and ground-based air traffic controllers. This vital system is the main communication channel for air traffic control. For most communication in overland flights in air corridors a VHF-AM system using channels between 108 and 137 MHz in the VHF band is used. This system has a typical transmission range of 200 miles (320 km) for aircraft flying at cruising altitude. For flights in more remote areas, such as transoceanic airline flights, aircraft use the HF band or channels on the Inmarsat or Iridium satphone satellites. Military aircraft also use a dedicated UHF-AM band from 225.0 to 399.95 MHz.

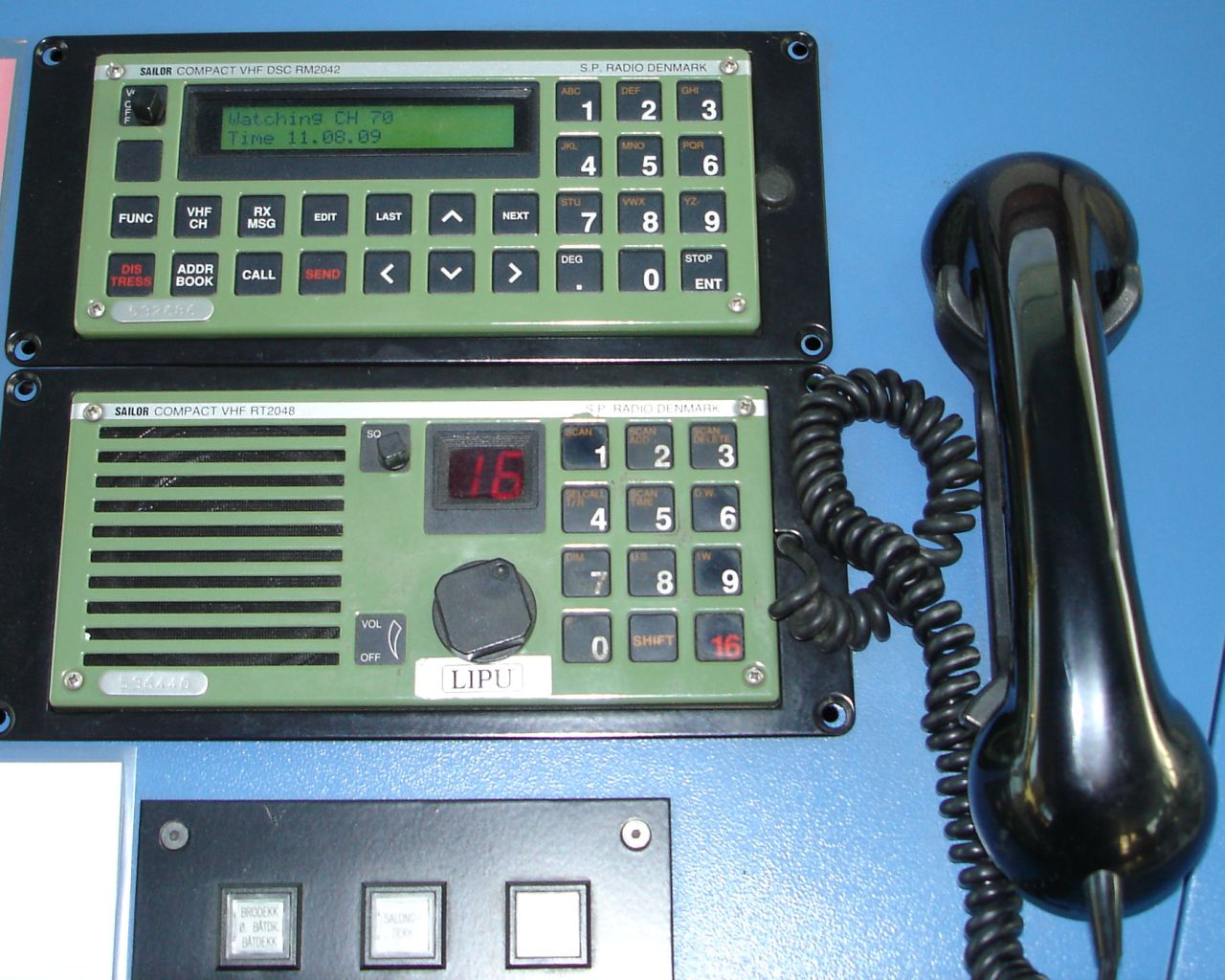
VHF marine radio on a ship

- Marine radio – medium-range transceivers on ships, used for ship-to-ship, ship-to-air, and ship-to-shore communication with harbormasters They use FM channels between 156 and 174 MHz in the VHF band with up to 25 watts power, giving them a range of about 60 miles (97 km). Some channels are half-duplex and some are full-duplex, to be compatible with the telephone network, to allow users to make telephone calls through a marine operator.
- Amateur radio – long-range half-duplex two-way radio used by hobbyists for non-commercial purposes: recreational radio contacts with other amateurs, volunteer emergency communication during disasters, contests, and experimentation. Radio amateurs must hold an amateur radio license and are given a unique callsign that must be used as an identifier in transmissions. Amateur radio is restricted to small frequency bands, the amateur radio bands, spaced throughout the radio spectrum starting at 136 kHz. Within these bands, amateurs are allowed the freedom to transmit on any frequency using a wide variety of voice modulation methods, along with other forms of communication, such as slow-scan television (SSTV), and radioteletype (RTTY). Additionally, amateurs are among the only radio operators still using Morse code radiotelegraphy.
- Scanner - a receiver that continuously monitors multiple frequencies or radio channels by stepping through the channels repeatedly, listening briefly to each channel for a transmission. When a transmitter is found the receiver stops at that channel. Scanners are used to monitor emergency police, fire, and ambulance frequencies, as well as other two way radio frequencies such as citizens band. Scanning capabilities have also become a standard feature in communications receivers, walkie-talkies, and other two-way radios.
- Communications receiver or shortwave receiver - a general purpose audio receiver covering the LF, MF, shortwave (HF), and VHF bands. Used mostly with a separate shortwave transmitter for two-way voice communication in communication stations, amateur radio stations, and for shortwave listening.

=== One-way voice communication ===
One way, unidirectional radio transmission is called simplex.

- Baby monitor – a crib-side appliance for parents of infants that transmits the baby's sounds to a receiver carried by the parent, so they can monitor the baby while they are in other parts of the house. The wavebands used vary by region, but analog baby monitors generally transmit with low power in the 16, 9.3–49.9 or 900 MHz wavebands, and digital systems in the 2.4 GHz waveband. Many baby monitors have duplex channels so the parent can talk to the baby, and cameras to show video of the baby.
- Wireless microphone – a battery-powered microphone with a short-range transmitter that is handheld or worn on a person's body which transmits its sound by radio to a nearby receiver unit connected to a sound system. Wireless microphones are used by public speakers, performers, and television personalities so they can move freely without trailing a microphone cord. Traditionally, analog models transmit in FM on unused portions of the television broadcast frequencies in the VHF and UHF bands. Some models transmit on two frequency channels for diversity reception to prevent nulls from interrupting transmission as the performer moves around. While some consumer models use digital modulation in the 900 MHz, 2.4 GHz, or 6 GHz ISM bands, most professional wireless microphone and in-ear monitor (IEM) systems operate in the UHF TV band (typically 470–702 MHz). Modern developments include Wireless Multichannel Audio Systems (WMAS), which utilize wideband transmission to support high channel density within a single radio frequency carrier. While European ETSI standards have supported WMAS for several years, the U.S. Federal Communications Commission (FCC) officially adopted rules in February 2024 to allow WMAS operation in the United States. This regulatory change led to the introduction of wideband digital platforms such as Sennheiser’s Spectera and Shure’s Axient Digital PSM (ADPSM), which allow for bidirectional audio and increased spectral efficiency at large-scale events.

== Data communication ==
- Wireless networking – automated radio links which transmit digital data between computers and other wireless devices using radio waves, linking the devices together transparently in a computer network. Computer networks can transmit any form of data: in addition to email and web pages, they also carry phone calls (VoIP), audio, and video content (called streaming media). Security is more of an issue for wireless networks than for wired networks since anyone nearby with a wireless modem can access the signal and attempt to log in. The radio signals of wireless networks are encrypted using WPA.
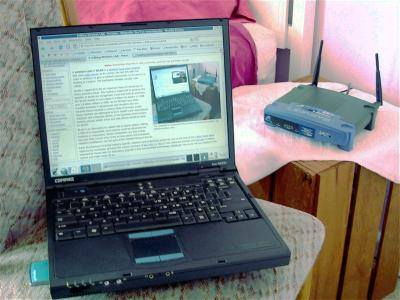
  - A laptop (with Wi-Fi module) and a typical home wireless router (on the right) connecting it to the Internet. The laptop shows its own photo
    Wireless LAN (wireless local area network or Wi-Fi) – based on the IEEE 802.11 standards, these are the most widely used computer networks, used to implement local area networks without cables, linking computers, laptops, cell phones, video game consoles, smart TVs and printers in a home or office together, and to a wireless router connecting them to the Internet with a wire or cable connection. Wireless routers in public places like libraries, hotels and coffee shops create wireless access points (hotspots) to allow the public to access the Internet with portable devices like smartphones, tablets or laptops. Each device exchanges data using a wireless modem (wireless network interface controller), an automated microwave transmitter and receiver with an omnidirectional antenna that works in the background, exchanging data packets with the router. Wi-Fi uses channels in the 2.4 GHz and 5 GHz ISM bands with OFDM (orthogonal frequency-division multiplexing) modulation to transmit data at high rates. The transmitters in Wi-Fi modems are limited to a radiated power of 200 mW to 1 watt, depending on country. They have a maximum indoor range of about 150 ft (50 m) on 2.4 GHz and 50 ft (20 m) on 5 GHz.
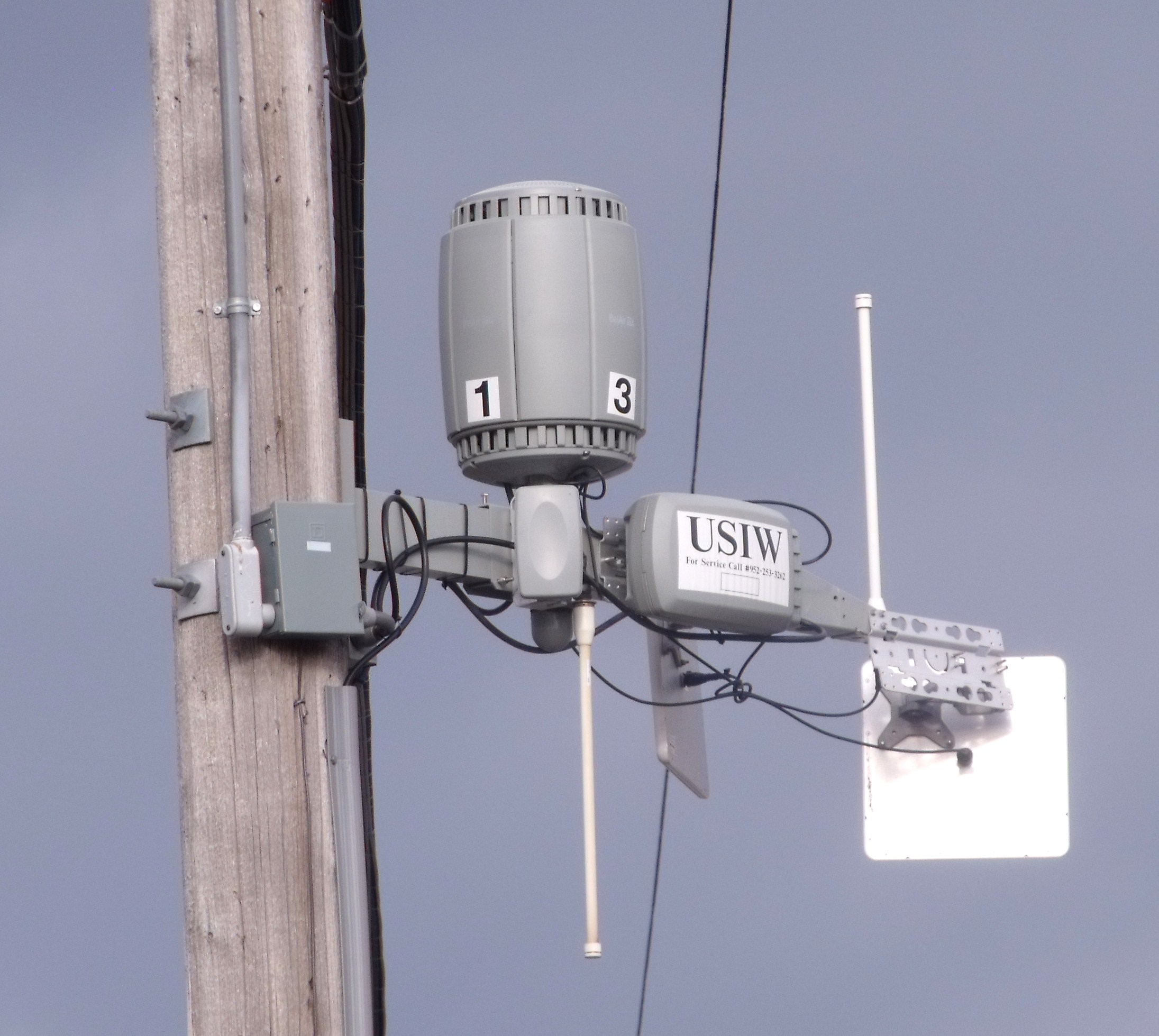
  - Neighborhood wireless WAN router on telephone pole
    Wireless WAN (wireless wide area network, WWAN) – a variety of technologies that provide wireless internet access over a wider area than Wi-Fi networks do – from an office building to a campus to a neighborhood, or to an entire city. The most common technologies used are: cellular modems, that exchange computer data by radio with cell towers; satellite internet access; and lower frequencies in the UHF band, which have a longer range than Wi-Fi frequencies. Since WWAN networks are much more expensive and complicated to administer than Wi-Fi networks, their use so far has generally been limited to private networks operated by large corporations.
  - Bluetooth – a very short-range wireless interface on a portable wireless device used as a substitute for a wire or cable connection, mainly to exchange files between portable devices and connect cellphones and music players with wireless headphones. In the most widely used mode, transmission power is limited to 1 milliwatt, giving it a very short range of up to 10 m (30 feet). The system uses frequency-hopping spread spectrum transmission, in which successive data packets are transmitted in a pseudorandom order on one of 79 1 MHz Bluetooth channels between 2.4 and 2.83 GHz in the ISM band. This allows Bluetooth networks to operate in the presence of noise, other wireless devices and other Bluetooth networks using the same frequencies, since the chance of another device attempting to transmit on the same frequency at the same time as the Bluetooth modem is low. In the case of such a "collision", the Bluetooth modem just retransmits the data packet on another frequency.
  - Packet radio – a long-distance peer-to-peer wireless ad-hoc network in which data packets are exchanged between computer-controlled radio modems (transmitter/receivers) called nodes, which may be separated by miles, and maybe mobile. Each node only communicates with neighboring nodes, so packets of data are passed from node to node until they reach their destination using the X.25 network protocol. Packet radio systems are used to a limited degree by commercial telecommunications companies and by the amateur radio community.
- Text messaging (texting) – this is a service on cell phones, allowing a user to type a short alphanumeric message and send it to another phone number, and the text is displayed on the recipient's phone screen. It is based on the Short Message Service (SMS) which transmits using spare bandwidth on the control radio channel used by cell phones to handle background functions like dialing and cell handoffs. Due to technical limitations of the channel, text messages are limited to 160 alphanumeric characters.

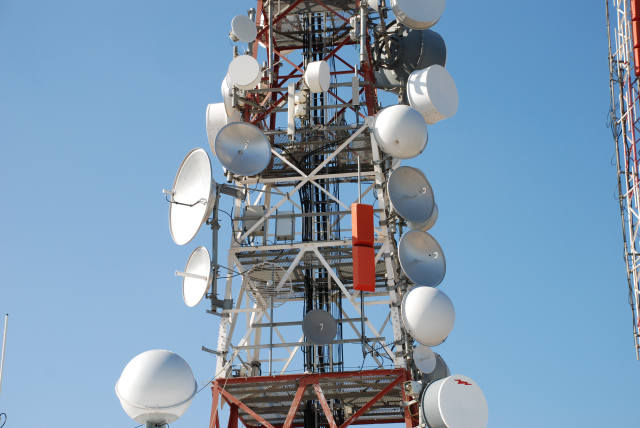
Parabolic antennas of microwave relay links on tower in Australia

- Microwave relay – a long-distance high bandwidth point-to-point digital data transmission link consisting of a microwave transmitter connected to a dish antenna that transmits a beam of microwaves to another dish antenna and receiver. Since the antennas must be in line-of-sight, distances are limited by the visual horizon to 30–40 miles (48–64 km). Microwave links are used for private business data, wide area computer networks (WANs), and by telephone companies to transmit long-distance phone calls and television signals between cities.
- Telemetry – automated one-way (simplex) transmission of measurements and operation data from a remote process or device to a receiver for monitoring. Telemetry is used for in-flight monitoring of missiles, drones, satellites, and weather balloon radiosondes, sending scientific data back to Earth from interplanetary spacecraft, communicating with electronic biomedical sensors implanted in the human body, and well logging. Multiple channels of data are often transmitted using frequency-division multiplexing or time-division multiplexing. Telemetry is starting to be used in consumer applications such as:
  - Automated meter reading – electric power meters, water meters, and gas meters that, when triggered by an interrogation signal, transmit their readings by radio to a utility reader vehicle at the curb, to eliminate the need for an employee to go on the customer's property to manually read the meter.
  - Electronic toll collection – on toll roads, an alternative to manual collection of tolls at a toll booth, in which a transponder in a vehicle, when triggered by a roadside transmitter, transmits a signal to a roadside receiver to register the vehicle's use of the road, enabling the owner to be billed for the toll.

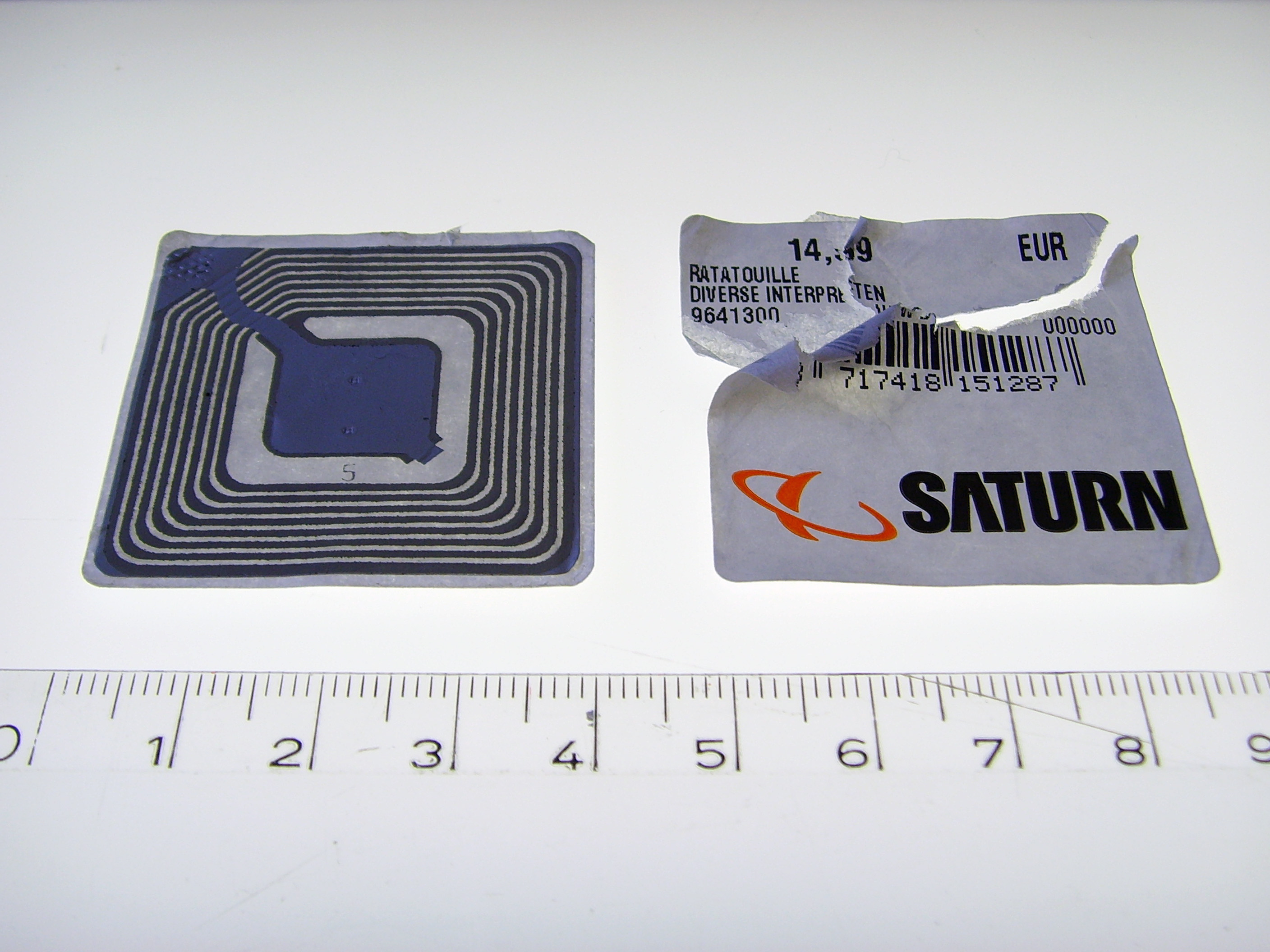
RFID tag from a DVD

- Radio Frequency Identification (RFID) – identification tags containing a tiny radio transponder (receiver and transmitter) which are attached to merchandise. When it receives an interrogation pulse of radio waves from a nearby reader unit, the tag transmits back an ID number, which can be used to inventory goods. Passive tags, the most common type, have a chip powered by the radio energy received from the reader, rectified by a diode, and can be as small as a grain of rice. They are incorporated in products, clothes, railroad cars, library books, airline baggage tags and are implanted under the skin in pets and livestock (microchip implant) and even people. Privacy concerns have been addressed with tags that use encrypted signals and authenticate the reader before responding. Passive tags use 125–134 kHz, 13, 900 MHz and 2.4 and 5 GHz ISM bands and have a short range. Active tags, powered by a battery, are larger but can transmit a stronger signal, giving them a range of hundreds of meters.
- Submarine communication – When submerged, submarines are cut off from all ordinary radio communication with their military command authorities by the conductive seawater. However radio waves of low enough frequencies, in the VLF (30 to 3 kHz) and ELF (below 3 kHz) bands are able to penetrate seawater. Navies operate large shore transmitting stations with power output in the megawatt range to transmit encrypted messages to their submarines in the world's oceans. Due to the small bandwidth, these systems cannot transmit voice, only text messages at a slow data rate. The communication channel is one-way, since the long antennas needed to transmit VLF or ELF waves cannot fit on a submarine. VLF transmitters use miles long wire antennas like umbrella antennas. A few nations use ELF transmitters operating around 80 Hz, which can communicate with submarines at lower depths. These use even larger antennas called ground dipoles, consisting of two ground (Earth) connections 23–60 km (14–37 miles) apart, linked by overhead transmission lines to a power plant transmitter.

== Space communication ==
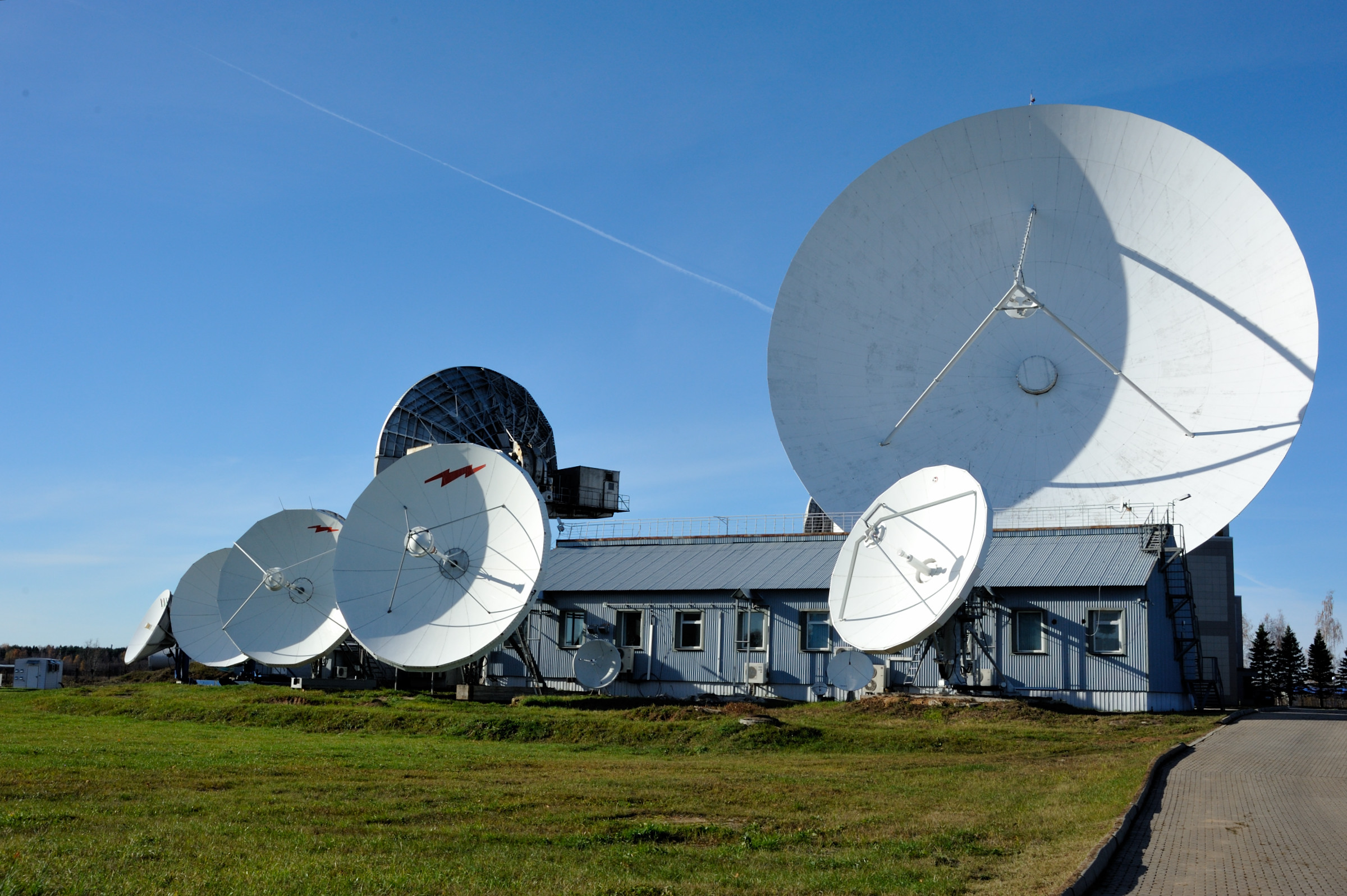
Satellite Communications Center Dubna in Russia

This is radio communication between a spacecraft and an Earth-based ground station, or another spacecraft. Communication with spacecraft involves the longest transmission distances of any radio links, up to billions of kilometers for interplanetary spacecraft. In order to receive the weak signals from distant spacecraft, satellite ground stations use large parabolic "dish" antennas up to 25 metres (82 ft) in diameter and extremely sensitive receivers. High frequencies in the microwave band are used, since microwaves pass through the ionosphere without refraction, and at microwave frequencies the high-gain antennas needed to focus the radio energy into a narrow beam pointed at the receiver are small and take up a minimum of space in a satellite. Portions of the UHF, L, C, S, k_{u} and k_{a} band are allocated for space communication. A radio link that transmits data from the Earth's surface to a spacecraft is called an uplink, while a link that transmits data from the spacecraft to the ground is called a downlink.

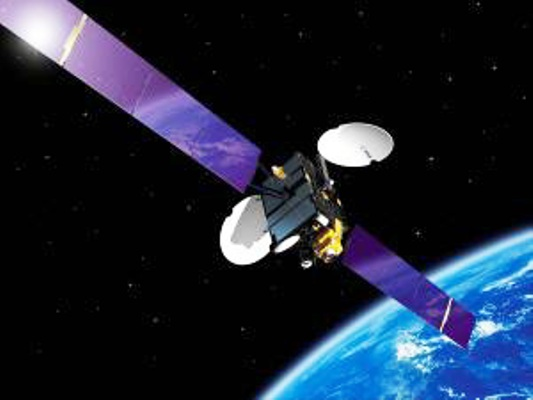
Communications satellite belonging to Azerbaijan

- Communication satellite – an artificial satellite used as a telecommunications relay to transmit data between widely separated points on Earth. These are used because the microwaves used for telecommunications travel by line of sight and so cannot propagate around the curve of the Earth. As of 1 January 2021, there were 2,224 communications satellites in Earth orbit. Most are in geostationary orbit 22,200 miles (35,700 km) above the equator, so that the satellite appears stationary at the same point in the sky, so the satellite dish antennas of ground stations can be aimed permanently at that spot and do not have to move to track it. In a satellite ground station a microwave transmitter and large satellite dish antenna transmit a microwave uplink beam to the satellite. The uplink signal carries many channels of telecommunications traffic, such as long-distance telephone calls, television programs, and internet signals, using a technique called frequency-division multiplexing (FDM). On the satellite, a transponder receives the signal, translates it to a different downlink frequency to avoid interfering with the uplink signal, and retransmits it down to another ground station, which may be widely separated from the first. There the downlink signal is demodulated and the telecommunications traffic it carries is sent to its local destinations through landlines. Communication satellites typically have several dozen transponders on different frequencies, which are leased by different users.
- Direct broadcast satellite – a geostationary communication satellite that transmits retail programming directly to receivers in subscriber's homes and vehicles on Earth, in satellite radio and TV systems. It uses a higher transmitter power than other communication satellites, to allow the signal to be received by consumers with a small unobtrusive antenna. For example, satellite television uses downlink frequencies from 12.2 to 12.7 GHz in the k_{u} band transmitted at 100 to 250 watts, which can be received by relatively small 43–80 cm (17–31 in) satellite dishes mounted on the outside of buildings.

== Medicine ==
Medical applications of radio frequency (RF) energy, in the form of electromagnetic waves (radio waves) or electrical currents, have existed for over 125 years, and now include diathermy, hyperthermy treatment of cancer, electrosurgery scalpels used to cut and cauterize in operations, and radiofrequency ablation. Magnetic resonance imaging (MRI) uses radio frequency fields to generate images of the human body.

== Other applications ==
=== Radar ===
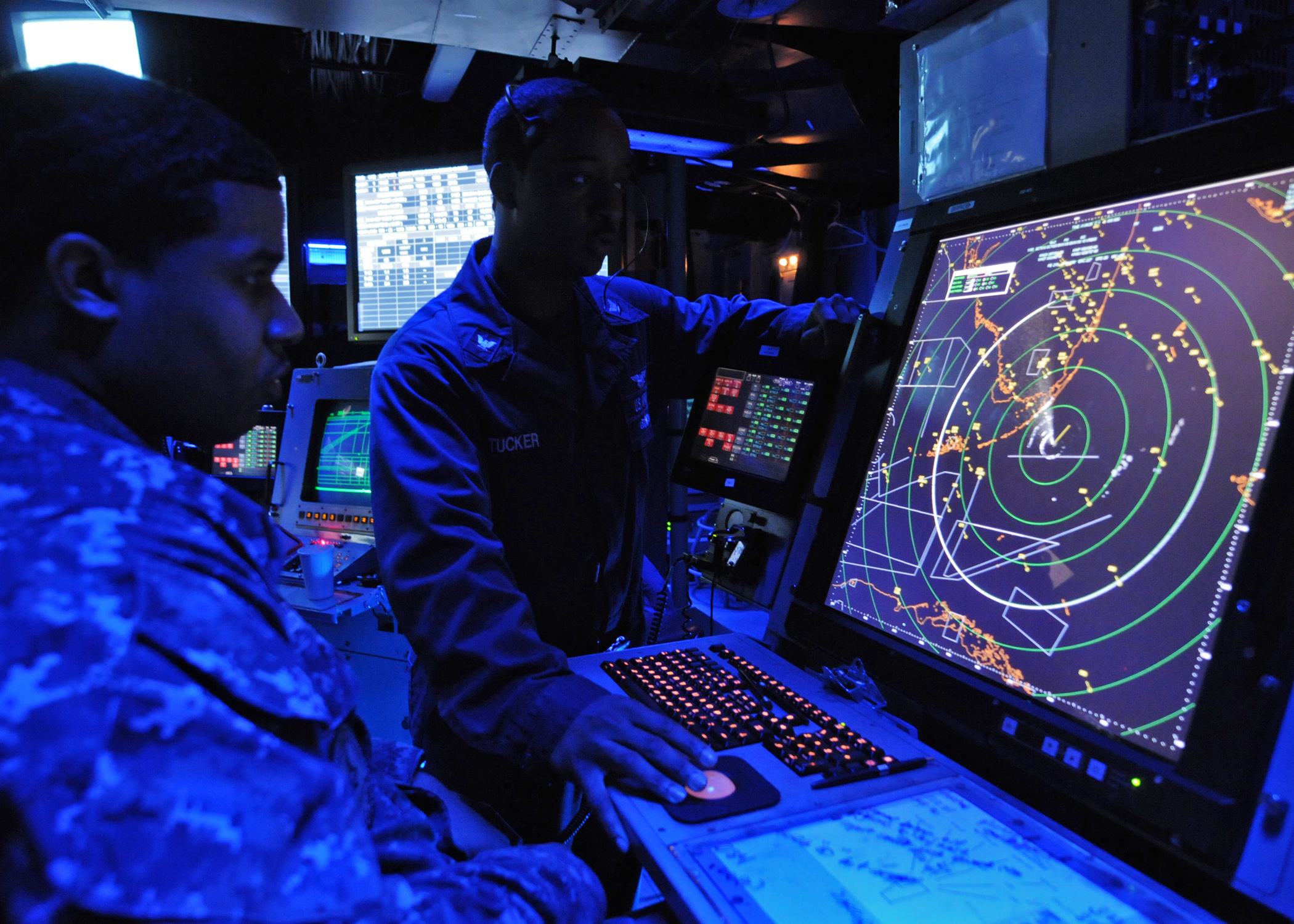
Military air traffic controller on US Navy aircraft carrier monitors aircraft on radar screen

Radar is a radiolocation method used to locate and track aircraft, spacecraft, missiles, ships, vehicles, and also to map weather patterns and terrain. A radar set consists of a transmitter and receiver. The transmitter emits a narrow beam of radio waves which is swept around the surrounding space. When the beam strikes a target object, radio waves are reflected back to the receiver. The direction of the beam reveals the object's location. Since radio waves travel at a constant speed close to the speed of light, by measuring the brief time delay between the outgoing pulse and the received "echo", the range to the target can be calculated. The targets are often displayed graphically on a map display called a radar screen. Doppler radar can measure a moving object's velocity, by measuring the change in frequency of the return radio waves due to the Doppler effect.

Radar sets mainly use high frequencies in the microwave bands, because these frequencies create strong reflections from objects the size of vehicles and can be focused into narrow beams with compact antennas. Parabolic (dish) antennas are widely used. In most radars the transmitting antenna also serves as the receiving antenna; this is called a monostatic radar. A radar which uses separate transmitting and receiving antennas is called a bistatic radar.

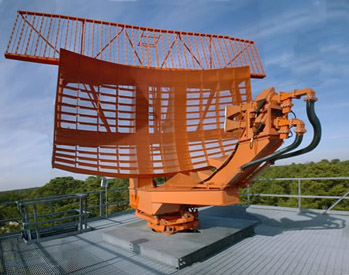
ASR-8 airport surveillance radar antenna. It rotates once every 4.8 seconds. The rectangular antenna on top is the secondary radar.

- Airport surveillance radar – In aviation, radar is the main tool of air traffic control. A rotating dish antenna sweeps a vertical fan-shaped beam of microwaves around the airspace and the radar set shows the location of aircraft as "blips" of light on a display called a radar screen. Airport radar operates at 2.7 – 2.9 GHz in the microwave S band. In large airports the radar image is displayed on multiple screens in an operations room called the TRACON (Terminal Radar Approach Control), where air traffic controllers direct the aircraft by radio to maintain safe aircraft separation.
  - Secondary surveillance radar – Aircraft carry radar transponders, transceivers which when triggered by the incoming radar signal transmit a return microwave signal. This causes the aircraft to show up more strongly on the radar screen. The radar which triggers the transponder and receives the return beam, usually mounted on top of the primary radar dish, is called the secondary surveillance radar. Since radar cannot measure an aircraft's altitude with any accuracy, the transponder also transmits back the aircraft's altitude measured by its altimeter, and an ID number identifying the aircraft, which is displayed on the radar screen.
- Electronic countermeasures (ECM) – Military defensive electronic systems designed to degrade enemy radar effectiveness, or deceive it with false information, to prevent enemies from locating local forces. It often consists of powerful microwave transmitters that can mimic enemy radar signals to create false target indications on the enemy radar screens.

Rotating marine radar antenna on a ship

- Marine radar – an S or X band radar on ships used to detect nearby ships and obstructions like bridges. A rotating antenna sweeps a vertical fan-shaped beam of microwaves around the water surface surrounding the craft out to the horizon.
- Weather radar – A Doppler radar which maps weather precipitation intensities and wind speeds with the echoes returned from raindrops and their radial velocity by their Doppler shift.
- Phased-array radar – a radar set that uses a phased array, a computer-controlled antenna that can steer the radar beam quickly to point in different directions without moving the antenna. Phased-array radars were developed by the military to track fast-moving missiles and aircraft. They are widely used in military equipment and are now spreading to civilian applications.
- Synthetic aperture radar (SAR) – a specialized airborne radar set that produces a high-resolution map of ground terrain. The radar is mounted on an aircraft or spacecraft and the radar antenna radiates a beam of radio waves sideways at right angles to the direction of motion, toward the ground. In processing the return radar signal, the motion of the vehicle is used to simulate a large antenna, giving the radar a higher resolution.
- Ground-penetrating radar – a specialized radar instrument that is rolled along the ground surface in a cart and transmits a beam of radio waves into the ground, producing an image of subsurface objects. Frequencies from 100 MHz to a few GHz are used. Since radio waves cannot penetrate very far into earth, the depth of GPR is limited to about 50 feet.
- Collision avoidance system – a short range radar or LIDAR system on an automobile or vehicle that detects if the vehicle is about to collide with an object and applies the brakes to prevent the collision.
- Radar fuze – a detonator for an aerial bomb which uses a radar altimeter to measure the height of the bomb above the ground as it falls and detonates it at a certain altitude.

=== Radiolocation ===
Radiolocation is a generic term covering a variety of techniques that use radio waves to find the location of objects, or for navigation.

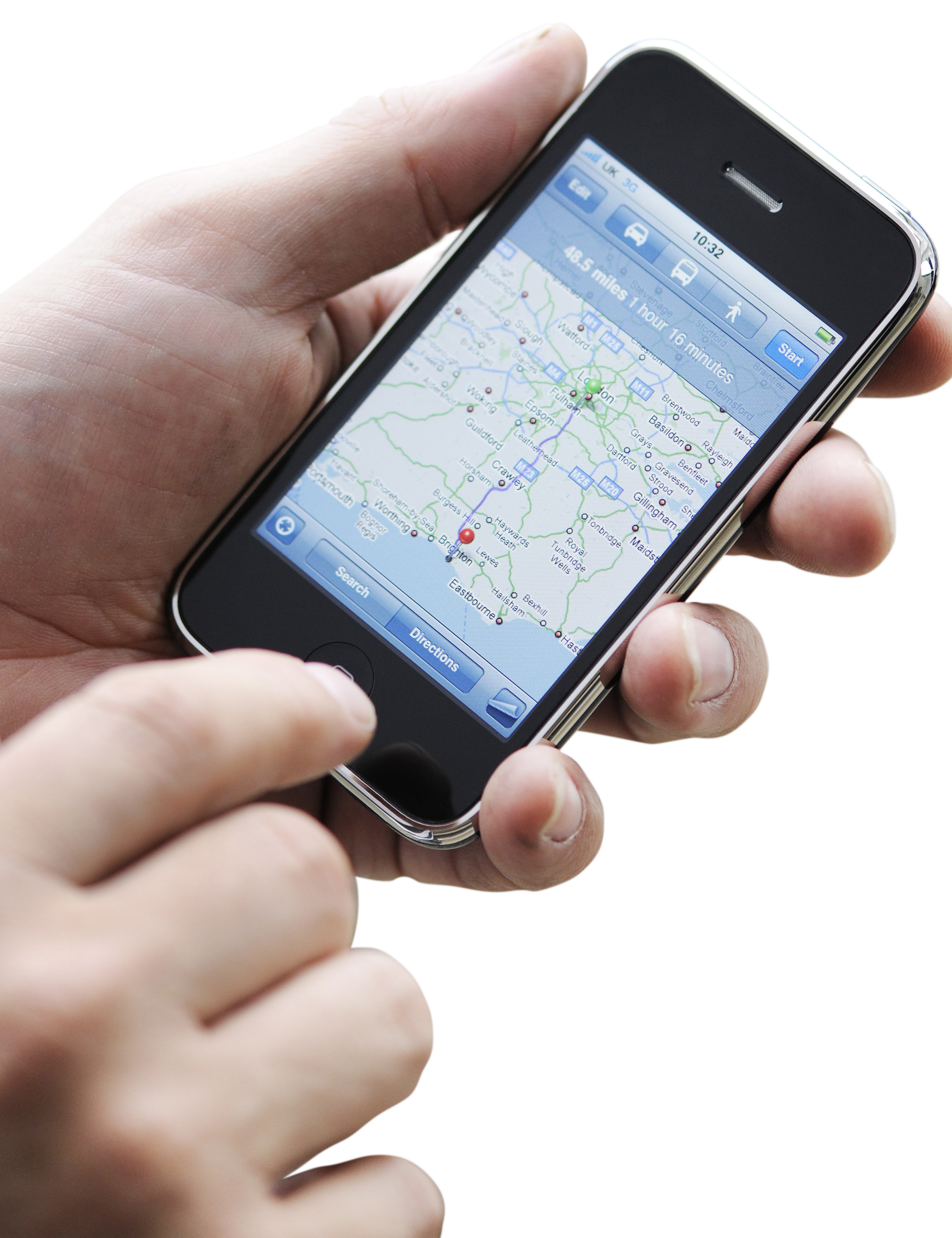
An early iPhone with its GPS navigation app in use.

- Global Navigation Satellite System (GNSS) or satnav system – A system of satellites which allows geographical location on Earth (latitude, longitude, and altitude/elevation) to be determined to high precision (within a few metres) by small portable navigation instruments, by timing the arrival of radio signals from the satellites. These are the most widely used navigation systems today. The main satellite navigation systems are the US Global Positioning System (GPS), Russia's GLONASS, China's BeiDou Navigation Satellite System (BDS) and the European Union's Galileo.

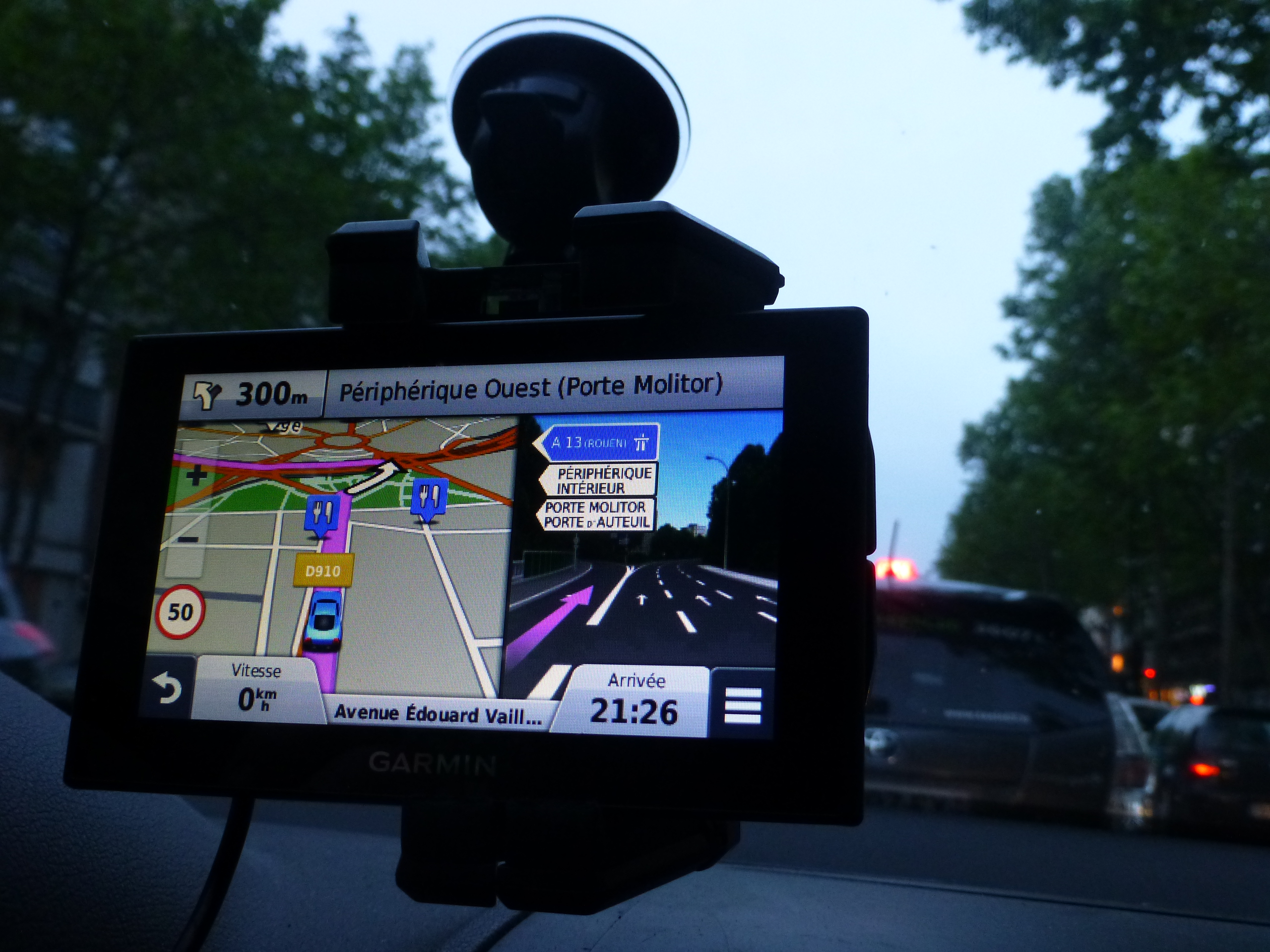
A personal navigation assistant by Garmin, which uses GPS to give driving directions to a destination.

  - Global Positioning System (GPS) – The most widely used satellite navigation system, maintained by the US Air Force, which uses a constellation of 31 satellites in low Earth orbit. The orbits of the satellites are distributed so at any time at least four satellites are above the horizon over each point on Earth. Each satellite has an onboard atomic clock and transmits a continuous radio signal containing a precise time signal as well as its current position. Two frequencies are used, 1.2276 and 1.57542 GHz. Since the velocity of radio waves is virtually constant, the delay of the radio signal from a satellite is proportional to the distance of the receiver from the satellite. By receiving the signals from at least four satellites a GPS receiver can calculate its position on Earth by comparing the arrival time of the radio signals. Since each satellite's position is known precisely at any given time, from the delay the position of the receiver can be calculated by a microprocessor in the receiver. The position can be displayed as latitude and longitude, or as a marker on an electronic map. GPS receivers are incorporated in almost all cellphones and in vehicles such as automobiles, aircraft, and ships, and are used to guide drones, missiles, cruise missiles, and even artillery shells to their target, and handheld GPS receivers are produced for hikers and the military.
- Radio beacon – a fixed location terrestrial radio transmitter which transmits a continuous radio signal used by aircraft and ships for navigation. The locations of beacons are plotted on navigational maps used by aircraft and ships.

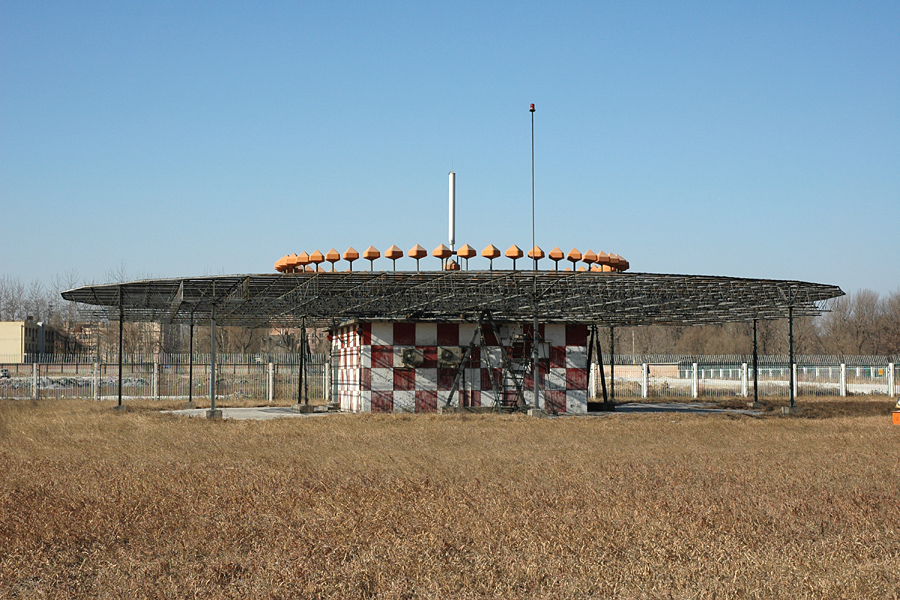
VOR antenna, Beijing

- VHF omnidirectional range (VOR) – a worldwide aircraft radio navigation system consisting of fixed ground radio beacons transmitting between 108.00 and 117.95 MHz in the very high frequency (VHF) band. An automated navigational instrument on the aircraft displays a bearing to a nearby VOR transmitter. A VOR beacon transmits two signals simultaneously on different frequencies. A directional antenna transmits a beam of radio waves that rotates like a lighthouse at a fixed rate, 30 times per second. When the directional beam is facing north, an omnidirectional antenna transmits a pulse. By measuring the difference in phase of these two signals, an aircraft can determine its bearing (or "radial") from the station accurately. By taking a bearing on two VOR beacons an aircraft can determine its position (called a "fix") to an accuracy of about 90 metres (300 ft). Most VOR beacons also have a distance measuring capability, called distance measuring equipment (DME); these are called VOR/DME's. The aircraft transmits a radio signal to the VOR/DME beacon and a transponder transmits a return signal. From the propagation delay between the transmitted and received signal the aircraft can calculate its distance from the beacon. This allows an aircraft to determine its location "fix" from only one VOR beacon. Since line-of-sight VHF frequencies are used VOR beacons have a range of about 200 miles for aircraft at cruising altitude. TACAN is a similar military radio beacon system which transmits in 962–1213 MHz, and a combined VOR and TACAN beacon is called a VORTAC. The number of VOR beacons is declining as aviation switches to the RNAV system that relies on Global Positioning System satellite navigation.

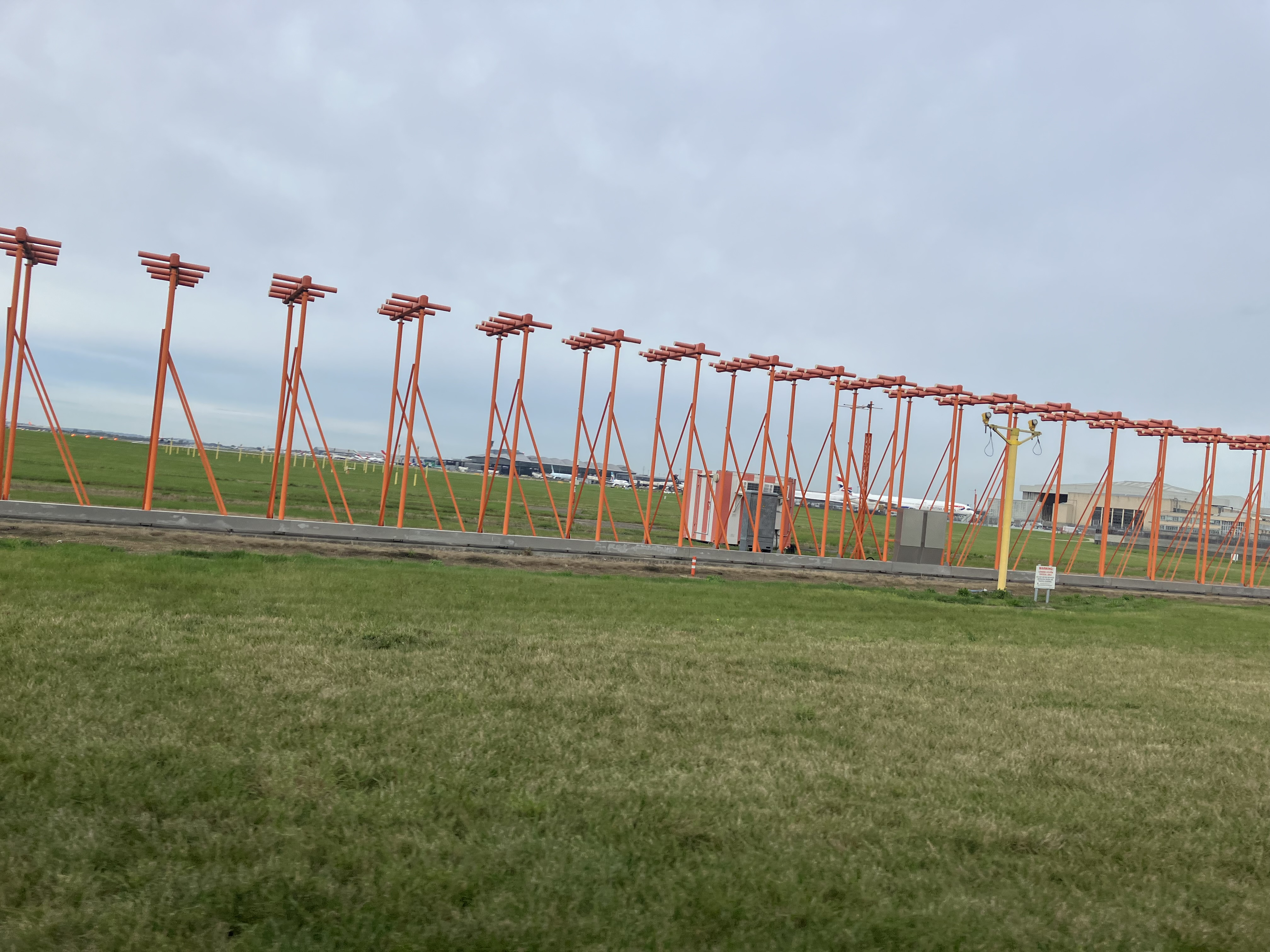
Localizer antenna array at Heathrow Airport, London

- Instrument Landing System (ILS) - A short range radio navigation aid at airports which guides aircraft landing in low visibility conditions. It consists of multiple antennas at the end of each runway that radiate two beams of radio waves along the approach to the runway: the localizer (108 to 111.95 MHz frequency), which provides horizontal guidance, a heading line to keep the aircraft centered on the runway, and the glideslope (329.15 to 335 MHz) for vertical guidance, to keep the aircraft descending at the proper rate for a smooth touchdown at the correct point on the runway. Each aircraft has a receiver instrument and antenna which receives the beams, with an indicator to tell the pilot whether he is on the correct horizontal and vertical approach. The ILS beams are receivable for at least 15 miles, and have a radiated power of 25 watts. ILS systems at airports are being replaced by systems that use satellite navigation.
- Non-directional beacon (NDB) – Legacy fixed radio beacons used before the VOR system that transmit a simple signal in all directions for aircraft or ships to use for radio direction finding. Aircraft use automatic direction finder (ADF) receivers which use a directional antenna to determine the bearing to the beacon. By taking bearings on two beacons they can determine their position. NDBs use frequencies between 190 and 1750 kHz in the LF and MF bands which propagate beyond the horizon as ground waves or skywaves much farther than VOR beacons. They transmit a callsign consisting of one to 3 Morse code letters as an identifier.

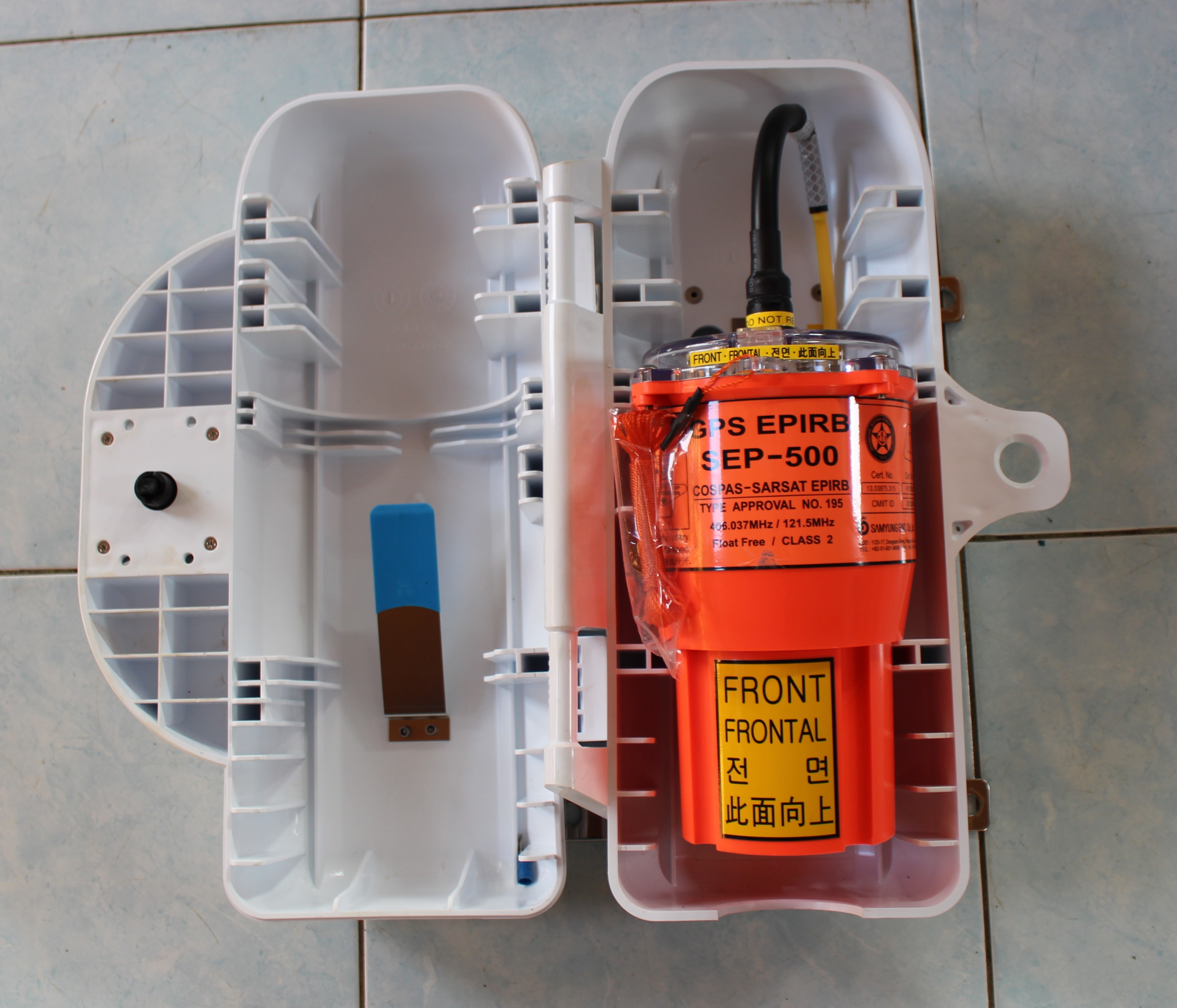
EPIRB emergency locator beacon on a ship

- Emergency locator beacon – a portable battery powered radio transmitter used in emergencies to locate airplanes, vessels, and persons in distress and in need of immediate rescue. Various types of emergency locator beacons are carried by aircraft, ships, vehicles, hikers and cross-country skiers. In the event of an emergency, such as the aircraft crashing, the ship sinking, or a hiker becoming lost, the transmitter is deployed and begins to transmit a continuous radio signal, which is used by search and rescue teams to quickly find the emergency and render aid. The latest generation Emergency Position Indicating Rescue Beacons (EPIRBs) contain a GPS receiver, and broadcast to rescue teams their exact location within 20 meters.
  - Cospas-Sarsat – an international humanitarian consortium of governmental and private agencies which acts as a dispatcher for search and rescue operations. It operates a network of around 65 satellites carrying radio receivers, which detect distress signals from emergency locator beacons anywhere on Earth transmitting on the international Cospas distress frequency of 406 MHz. The satellites calculate the geographic location of the beacon within 2 km by measuring the Doppler frequency shift of the radio waves due to the relative motion of the transmitter and the satellite, and quickly transmit the information to the appropriate local first responder organizations, which perform the search and rescue.

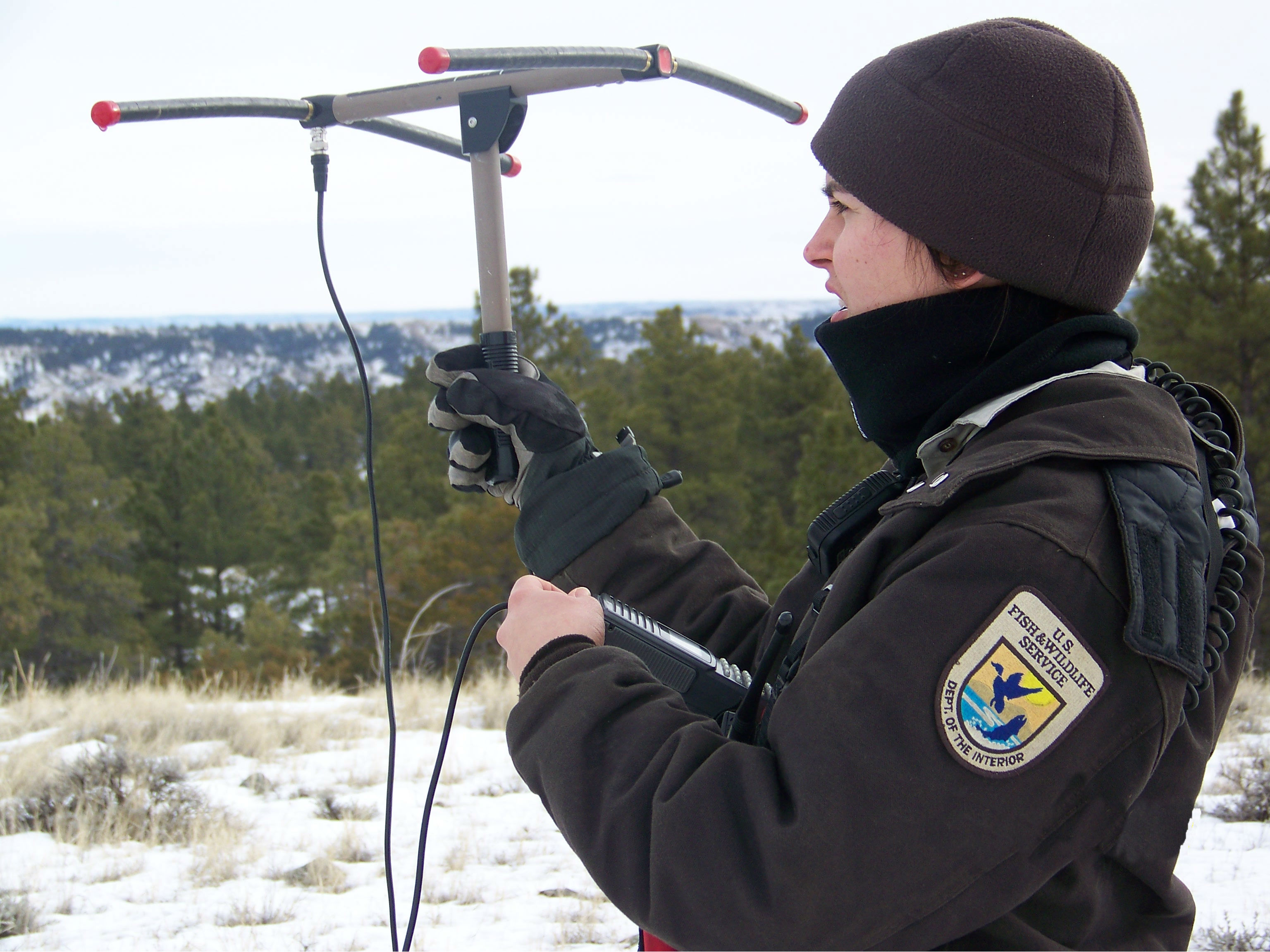
Wildlife officer tracking radio-tagged mountain lion

- Radio direction finding (RDF) – this is a general technique, used since the early 1900s, of using specialized radio receivers with directional antennas (RDF receivers) to determine the exact bearing of a radio signal, to determine the location of the transmitter. The location of a terrestrial transmitter can be determined by simple triangulation from bearings taken by two RDF stations separated geographically, as the point where the two bearing lines cross, this is called a "fix". Military forces use RDF to locate enemy forces by their tactical radio transmissions, counterintelligence services use it to locate clandestine transmitters used by espionage agents, and governments use it to locate unlicensed transmitters or interference sources. Older RDF receivers used rotatable loop antennas, the antenna is rotated until the radio signal strength is weakest, indicating the transmitter is in one of the antenna's two nulls. The nulls are used since they are sharper than the antenna's lobes (maxima). More modern receivers use phased array antennas which have a much greater angular resolution.
  - Animal migration tracking – a widely used technique in wildlife biology, conservation biology, and wildlife management in which small battery-powered radio transmitters are attached to wild animals so their movements can be tracked with a directional RDF receiver. Sometimes the transmitter is implanted in the animal. The VHF band is typically used since antennas in this band are fairly compact. The receiver has a directional antenna (typically a small Yagi) which is rotated until the received signal is strongest; at this point the antenna is pointing in the direction of the animal. Sophisticated systems used in recent years use satellites to track the animal, or geolocation tags with GPS receivers which record and transmit a log of the animal's location.

=== Remote control ===
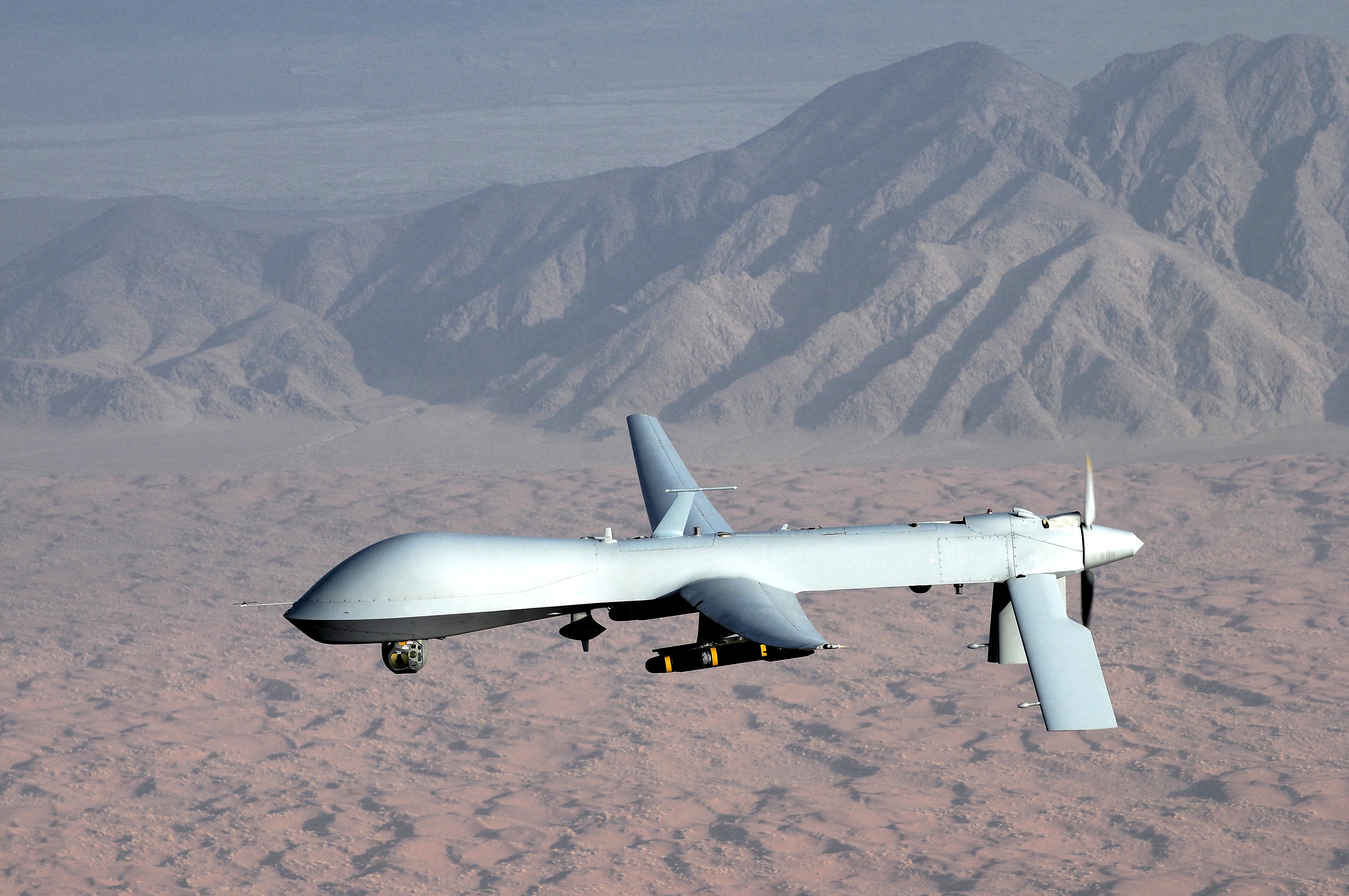
US Air Force MQ-1 Predator drone flown remotely by a pilot on the ground

Radio remote control is the use of electronic control signals sent by radio waves from a transmitter to control the actions of a device at a remote location. Remote control systems may also include telemetry channels in the other direction, used to transmit real-time information on the state of the device back to the control station. Uncrewed spacecraft are an example of remote-controlled machines, controlled by commands transmitted by satellite ground stations. Most handheld remote controls used to control consumer electronics products like televisions or DVD players actually operate by infrared light rather than radio waves, so are not examples of radio remote control. A security concern with remote control systems is spoofing, in which an unauthorized person transmits an imitation of the control signal to take control of the device. Examples of radio remote control:

- Unmanned aerial vehicle (UAV, drone) – A drone is an aircraft without an onboard pilot, flown by remote control by a pilot in another location, usually in a piloting station on the ground. They are used by the military for reconnaissance and ground attack, and more recently by the civilian world for news reporting and aerial photography. The pilot uses aircraft controls like a joystick or steering wheel, which create control signals which are transmitted to the drone by radio to control the flight surfaces and engine. A telemetry system transmits back a video image from a camera in the drone to allow the pilot to see where the aircraft is going, and data from a GPS receiver giving the real-time position of the aircraft. UAVs have sophisticated onboard automatic pilot systems that maintain stable flight and only require manual control to change directions.

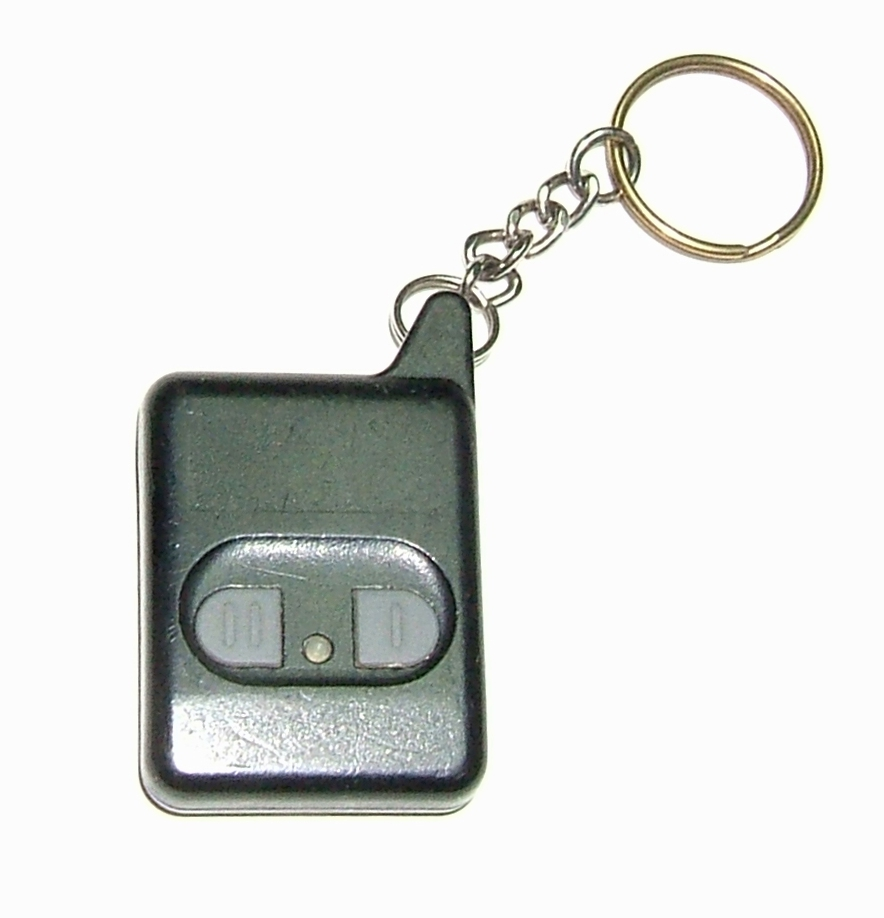
Remote keyless entry fob for a car

- Keyless entry system – a short-range handheld battery powered key fob transmitter, included with most modern cars, which can lock and unlock the doors of a vehicle from outside, eliminating the need to use a key. When a button is pressed, the transmitter sends a coded radio signal to a receiver in the vehicle, operating the locks. The fob must be close to the vehicle, typically within 5 to 20 meters. North America and Japan use a frequency of 315 MHz, while Europe uses 433.92 and 868 MHz. Some models can also remotely start the engine, to warm up the car. A security concern with all keyless entry systems is a replay attack, in which a thief uses a special receiver ("code grabber") to record the radio signal during opening, which can later be replayed to open the door. To prevent this, keyless systems use a rolling code system in which a pseudorandom number generator in the remote control generates a different random key each time it is used. To prevent thieves from simulating the pseudorandom generator to calculate the next key, the radio signal is also encrypted.
  - Garage door opener – a short-range handheld transmitter which can open or close a building's electrically operated garage door from outside, so the owner can open the door upon arrival, and close it after departure. When a button is pressed the control transmits a coded FSK radio signal to a receiver in the opener, raising or lowering the door. Modern openers use 310, 315 or 390 MHz. To prevent a thief using a replay attack, modern openers use a rolling code system.

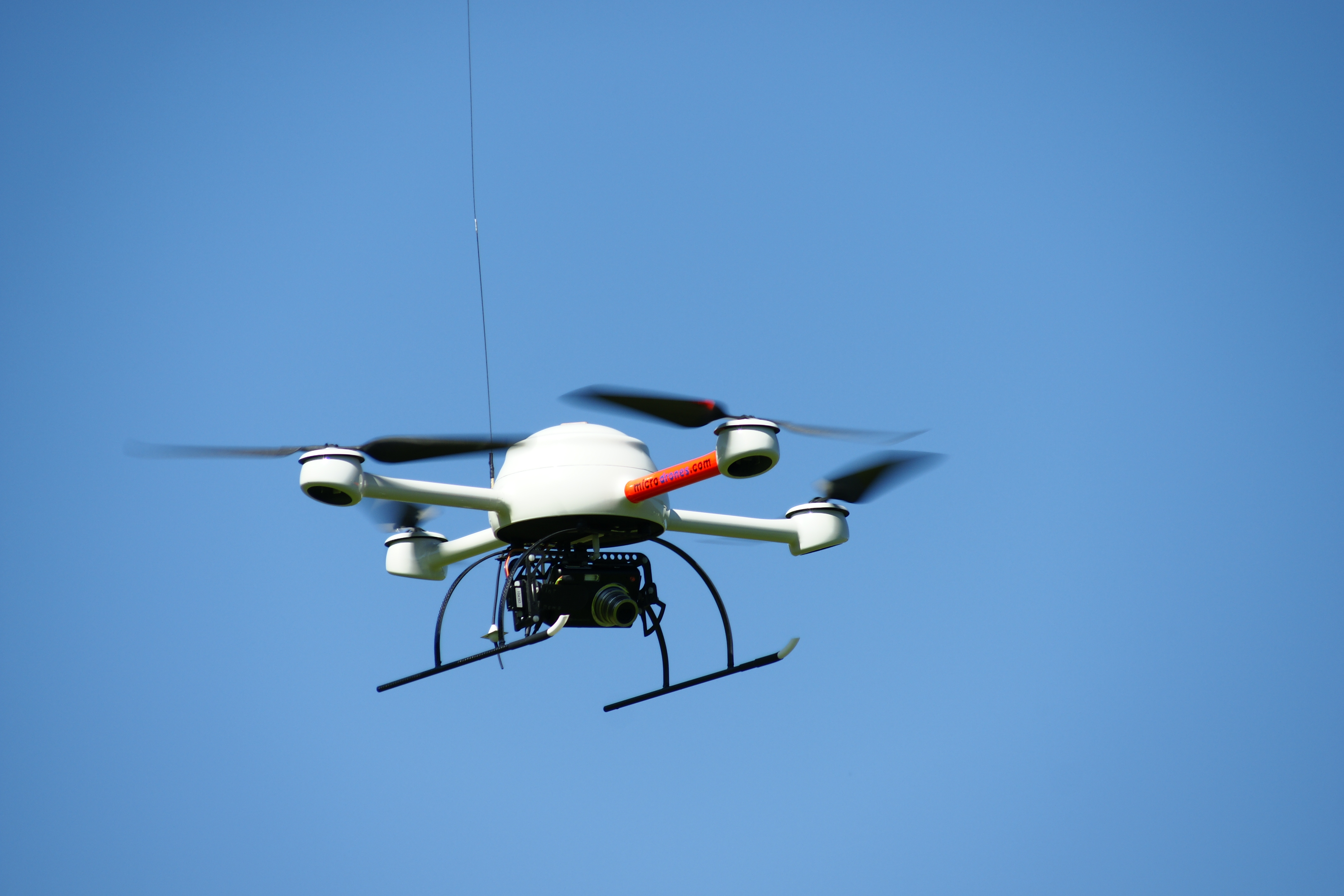
Quadcopter, a popular remote-controlled toy

- Radio-controlled models – a popular hobby is playing with radio-controlled model boats, cars, airplanes, and helicopters (quadcopters) which are controlled by radio signals from a handheld console with a joystick. Most recent transmitters use the 2.4 GHz ISM band with multiple control channels modulated with PWM, PCM or FSK.
- Wireless doorbell – A residential doorbell that uses wireless technology to eliminate the need to run wires through the building walls. It consists of a doorbell button beside the door containing a small battery powered transmitter. When the doorbell is pressed it sends a signal to a receiver inside the house with a speaker that sounds chimes to indicate someone is at the door. They usually use the 2.4 GHz ISM band. The frequency channel used can usually be changed by the owner in case another nearby doorbell is using the same channel.

=== Scientific research ===
- Radio astronomy is the scientific study of radio waves emitted by astronomical objects. Radio astronomers use radio telescopes, large radio antennas and receivers, to receive and study the radio waves from astronomical radio sources. Since astronomical radio sources are so far away, the radio waves from them are extremely weak, requiring extremely sensitive receivers, and radio telescopes are the most sensitive radio receivers in existence. They use large parabolic (dish) antennas up to 500 meters (2,000 ft) in diameter to collect enough radio wave energy to study. The RF front end electronics of the receiver is often cooled by liquid nitrogen to reduce thermal noise. Multiple antennas are often linked together in arrays which function as a single antenna, to increase collecting power. In Very Long Baseline Interferometry (VLBI) radio telescopes on different continents are linked, which can achieve the resolution of an antenna thousands of miles in diameter.
- Remote sensing – in radio, remote sensing is the reception of electromagnetic waves radiated by natural objects or the atmosphere for scientific research. All warm objects emit microwaves and the spectrum emitted can be used to determine temperature. Microwave radiometers are used in meteorology and earth sciences to determine temperature of the atmosphere and earth surface, as well as chemical reactions in the atmosphere.
  - Measuring receiver - a calibrated, laboratory grade radio receiver used to measure the characteristics of radio signals. Often incorporates a spectrum analyzer.
