= Radio clock =

Clock which synchronizes its time using radio transmitters

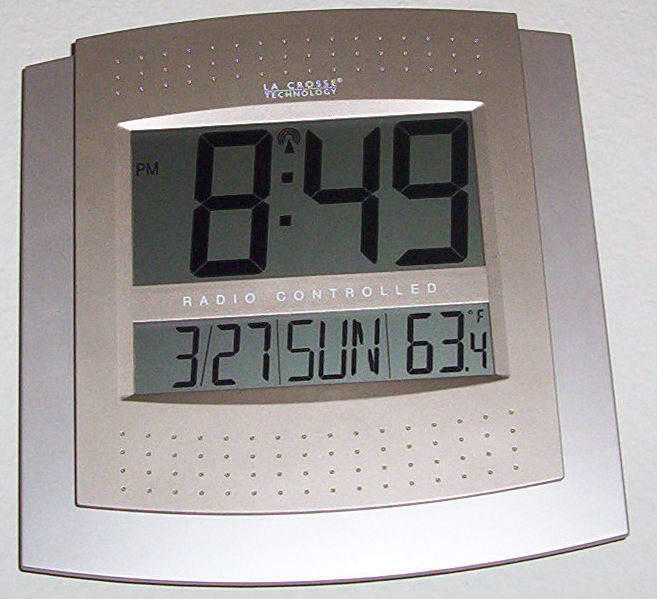
A modern LF radio-controlled clock

A radio clock or radio-controlled clock (RCC), and often colloquially (and incorrectly) referred to as an "atomic clock", is a type of quartz clock or watch that is automatically synchronized to a time code transmitted by a radio transmitter connected to a time standard such as an atomic clock. Such a clock may be synchronized to the time sent by a single transmitter, such as many national or regional time transmitters, or may use the multiple transmitters used by satellite navigation systems such as Global Positioning System. Such systems may be used to automatically set clocks or for any purpose where accurate time is needed. Radio clocks may include any feature available for a clock, such as alarm function, display of ambient temperature and humidity, broadcast radio reception, etc.

One common style of radio-controlled clock uses time signals transmitted by dedicated terrestrial longwave radio transmitters, which emit a time code that can be demodulated and displayed by the radio controlled clock. The radio controlled clock will contain an accurate time base oscillator to maintain timekeeping if the radio signal is momentarily unavailable. Other radio controlled clocks use the time signals transmitted by dedicated transmitters in the shortwave bands. Systems using dedicated time signal stations can achieve accuracy of a few tens of milliseconds.

Satellite navigation receivers also internally generate accurate time information from the satellite signals. Dedicated GPS timing receivers are accurate to better than 1 microsecond; however, general-purpose or consumer grade GPS may have an offset of up to one second between the internally calculated time, which is much more accurate than 1 second, and the time displayed on the screen.

Other broadcast services may include timekeeping information of varying accuracy within their signals. Timepieces with Bluetooth radio support, ranging from watches with basic control of functionality via a mobile app to full smartwatches obtain time information from a connected phone, with no need to receive time signal broadcasts.

== Single transmitter ==
Radio clocks synchronized to a terrestrial time signal can usually achieve an accuracy within a hundredth of a second relative to the time standard, generally limited by uncertainties and variability in radio propagation. Some timekeepers, particularly watches such as some Casio Wave Ceptors which are more likely than desk clocks to be used when travelling, can synchronise to any one of several different time signals transmitted in different regions.

=== Longwave and shortwave transmissions ===
Radio clocks depend on coded time signals from radio stations. The stations vary in broadcast frequency, in geographic location, and in how the signal is modulated to identify the current time. In general, each station has its own format for the time code.

==== List of radio time signal stations ====
List of radio time signal stations
Frequency	Callsign	Country Authority	Location	Aerial type	Power	Remarks
25 kHz	RJH69	Belarus; VNIIFTRI	Vileyka; 54°27′47″N 26°46′37″E	Triple umbrella antenna (Note: 3 umbrella antennas, fixed on 3 guyed tubular masts, insulated against ground with a height of 305 m (1,001 ft) and 15 guyed lattice masts with a height of 270 m (890 ft))	300 kW	This is Beta time signal. The signal is transmitted in non-overlapping time: 02:00–02:20 UTC RAB99; 04:00–04:25 UTC RJH86; 06:00–06:20 UTC RAB99; 07:00–07:25 UTC RJH69; 08:00–08:25 UTC RJH90; 09:00–09:25 UTC RJH77; 10:00–10:25 UTC RJH86; 11:00–11:20 UTC RJH63
25 kHz	RJH77	Russia; VNIIFTRI	Arkhangelsk; 64°21′29″N 41°33′58″E	Triple umbrella antenna (Note: 3 umbrella antennas, fixed on 18 guyed lattice masts, height of central masts: 305 metres)	300 kW	This is Beta time signal. The signal is transmitted in non-overlapping time: 02:00–02:20 UTC RAB99; 04:00–04:25 UTC RJH86; 06:00–06:20 UTC RAB99; 07:00–07:25 UTC RJH69; 08:00–08:25 UTC RJH90; 09:00–09:25 UTC RJH77; 10:00–10:25 UTC RJH86; 11:00–11:20 UTC RJH63
25 kHz	RJH63	Russia; VNIIFTRI	Krasnodar; 44°46′25″N 39°32′50″E	Umbrella antenna (Note: umbrella antenna, fixed on 13 guyed lattice masts, height of central mast: 425 m (1,394 ft))	300 kW	This is Beta time signal. The signal is transmitted in non-overlapping time: 02:00–02:20 UTC RAB99; 04:00–04:25 UTC RJH86; 06:00–06:20 UTC RAB99; 07:00–07:25 UTC RJH69; 08:00–08:25 UTC RJH90; 09:00–09:25 UTC RJH77; 10:00–10:25 UTC RJH86; 11:00–11:20 UTC RJH63
25 kHz	RJH90	Russia; VNIIFTRI	Nizhny Novgorod; 56°10′20″N 43°55′38″E	Triple umbrella antenna (Note: 3 umbrella antennas, fixed on 3 guyed tubular masts, insulated against ground with a height of 205 m (673 ft) and 15 guyed lattice masts with a height of 170 m (560 ft))	300 kW	This is Beta time signal. The signal is transmitted in non-overlapping time: 02:00–02:20 UTC RAB99; 04:00–04:25 UTC RJH86; 06:00–06:20 UTC RAB99; 07:00–07:25 UTC RJH69; 08:00–08:25 UTC RJH90; 09:00–09:25 UTC RJH77; 10:00–10:25 UTC RJH86; 11:00–11:20 UTC RJH63
25 kHz	RJH86 (Note: in air RJH66)	Kyrgyzstan; VNIIFTRI	Bishkek; 43°02′29″N 73°37′09″E	Triple umbrella antenna (Note: 3 umbrella antennas, fixed on 18 guyed lattice masts, height of central masts: 276 m (906 ft))	300 kW	This is Beta time signal. The signal is transmitted in non-overlapping time: 02:00–02:20 UTC RAB99; 04:00–04:25 UTC RJH86; 06:00–06:20 UTC RAB99; 07:00–07:25 UTC RJH69; 08:00–08:25 UTC RJH90; 09:00–09:25 UTC RJH77; 10:00–10:25 UTC RJH86; 11:00–11:20 UTC RJH63
25 kHz	RAB99	Russia; VNIIFTRI	Khabarovsk; 48°29′29″N 134°48′59″E	Umbrella antenna (Note: umbrella antenna, fixed on 18 guyed lattice masts arranged in 3 rows, height of central masts: 238 m (781 ft))	300 kW	This is Beta time signal. The signal is transmitted in non-overlapping time: 02:00–02:20 UTC RAB99; 04:00–04:25 UTC RJH86; 06:00–06:20 UTC RAB99; 07:00–07:25 UTC RJH69; 08:00–08:25 UTC RJH90; 09:00–09:25 UTC RJH77; 10:00–10:25 UTC RJH86; 11:00–11:20 UTC RJH63
40 kHz	JJY	Japan; NICT	Mount Otakadoya, Fukushima; 37°22′21″N 140°50′56″E	Capacitance hat, height 250 m (820 ft)	50 kW	Located near Fukushima
50 kHz	RTZ	Russia; VNIIFTRI	Irkutsk; 52°25′41″N 103°41′12″E	Umbrella antenna	10 kW	PM time code
60 kHz	JJY	Japan; NICT	Mount Hagane, Kyushu; 33°27′54″N 130°10′32″E	Capacitance hat, height 200 m (660 ft)	50 kW	Located on Kyūshū Island
60 kHz	MSF	United Kingdom; NPL	Anthorn, Cumbria; 54°54′27″N 03°16′24″W (Note: Before 1 April 2007, the signal was transmitted from Rugby, Warwickshire 52°21′33″N 01°11′21″W)	Triple T-antenna (Note: 3 T-antennas, spun 150 m (490 ft) above ground between two 227 m (745 ft) high guyed grounded masts in a distance of 655 m (716 yd))	17 kW	Range up to 1,500 km (930 mi)
60 kHz	WWVB	United States; NIST	Near Fort Collins, Colorado; 40°40′41″N 105°02′48″W	Two capacitance hats, height 122 m (400 ft)	70 kW	Received through most of mainland U.S.
66.66 kHz	RBU	Russia; VNIIFTRI	Taldom, Moscow; 56°43′59″N 37°39′47″E (Note: Before 2008, transmitter located at 55°44′14″N 38°09′04″E)	Umbrella antenna (Note: umbrella antenna, fixed on a 275 m (902 ft) high central tower insulated against ground and five 257 m (843 ft) high lattice masts insulated against ground in a distance of 324 metres (354 yards) from the central tower)	50 kW	PM time code
68.5 kHz	BPC	China; NTSC	Shangqiu, Henan; 34°27′25″N 115°50′13″E	4 guyed masts, arranged in a square	90 kW	21 hours per day, with a 3-hour break from 05:00–08:00 (China Standard Time) daily (21:00–24:00 UTC)
~~75 kHz~~	~~HBG~~	~~Switzerland~~; ~~METAS~~	~~Prangins~~; ~~46°24′24″N 06°15′04″E~~	~~T-antenna~~ (Note: T-antenna spun between two 125 m (410 ft) tall, grounded free-standing lattice towers in a distance of 227 m (248 yd))	~~20 kW~~	Discontinued as of 1 January 2012
77.5 kHz	DCF77	Germany; PTB	Mainflingen, Hessen; 50°00′58″N 09°00′29″E	Vertical omni-directional antennas with top-loading capacity, height 150 metres (490 ft)	50 kW	Located southeast of Frankfurt am Main with a range of up to 2,000 km (1,200 mi)
77.5 kHz	BSF	Taiwan	Zhongli; 25°00′19″N 121°21′55″E	T-antenna (Note: T-antenna spun between two telecommunication towers in a distance of 33 m (36 yd))		
100 kHz (Note: Frequency for radio navigation system)	BPL	China; NTSC	Pucheng, Shaanxi; 34°56′56″N 109°32′35″E	Single guyed lattice steel mast	800 kW	Loran-C compatible format signal on air from 05:30 to 13:30 UTC, with a reception radius up to 3,000 km (1,900 mi)
100 kHz	RNS-E	Russia; VNIIFTRI	Karachev (44 km from Bryansk); 53°07′49″N 34°54′37″E	5 guyed masts	800 kW	CHAYKA compatible format signal 04:00–10:00 UTC and 14:00–18:00 UTC
100 kHz	RNS-V	Russia; VNIIFTRI	Alexandrovsk-Sakhalinsky; 51°4′42.9″N 142°42′9.1″E	Single guyed mast	400 kW	CHAYKA compatible format signal 23:00–05:00 UTC and 11:00–17:00 UTC
129.1 kHz (Note: Frequency for radio teleswitch system)	DCF49	Germany; PTB	Mainflingen; 50°00′58″N 09°00′29″E	T-antenna	100 kW	EFR radio teleswitch time signal only (no reference frequency); FSK ± 170 Hz 200 baud
135.6 kHz	HGA22	Hungary; PTB	Lakihegy Tower; 47°22′24″N 19°00′17″E	Single guyed mast	100 kW	EFR radio teleswitch time signal only (no reference frequency); FSK ± 170 Hz 200 baud
139 kHz	DCF39	Germany; PTB	Burg bei Magdeburg; 52°17′13″N 11°53′49″E	Single guyed mast	50 kW	EFR radio teleswitch time signal only (no reference frequency); FSK ± 170 Hz 200 baud
162 kHz (Note: Frequency for AM-broadcasting)	ALS162	France; ANFR	Allouis; 47°10′10″N 02°12′16″E	Two guyed steel lattice masts, height 350 m (1,150 ft), fed on the top	800 kW	AM-broadcasting transmitter, located 150 km (93 mi) south of Paris with a range of up to 3,500 km (2,200 mi), using PM with encoding similar to DCF77 (Note: and requiring a more complex receiver for demodulating time signal)
198 kHz (Note: since 1988, before 200 kHz)	BBC Radio 4	United Kingdom; NPL	Droitwich; 52.2955°N 2.1063°W	T-aerial (Note: Droitwich uses a T-aerial suspended between two 213 metres (699') guyed steel lattice radio masts, which stand 180 m (200 yd) apart.)	500 kW	Additional (50 kW) transmitters is at Burghead and Westerglen. The time signal is transmitted by 25-bit/s phase modulation.
225 kHz	Polskie Radio	Poland	Solec Kujawski; 53°1′12.92″N 18°15′44.28″E	Guyed mast	1000 kW	Phase-modulated time signal
2.5 MHz	BPM	China; NTSC	Pucheng, Shaanxi; 34°56′56″N 109°32′35″E			(BCD time code on 125 Hz sub-carrier not yet activated) 07:30–01:00 UTC
2.5 MHz	WWV	United States; NIST	Near Fort Collins, Colorado; 40°40′41″N 105°02′48″W	Broadband monopole	2.5 kW	Binary-coded decimal (BCD) time code on 100 Hz sub-carrier
2.5 MHz	WWVH	United States; NIST	Kekaha, Hawaii; 21°59′16″N 159°45′46″W		5 kW	Binary-coded decimal (BCD) time code on 100 Hz sub-carrier
3.33 MHz	CHU	Canada; NRC	Ottawa, Ontario; 45°17′40″N 75°45′27″W		3 kW	300 baud Bell 103 time code. Discontinued effective 22 June 2026.
4.996 MHz	RWM	Russia; VNIIFTRI	Taldom, Moscow; 56°44′58″N 37°38′23″E		10 kW	CW (1 Hz, 10 Hz)
5 MHz	BPM	China; NTSC	Pucheng, Shaanxi; 34°56′56″N 109°32′35″E			BCD time code on 125 Hz sub-carrier. 00:00–24:00 UTC
5 MHz	HLA	Korea; KRISS	Daejeon; 36°23′14″N 127°21′59″E		2 kW	
5 MHz	WWV	United States; NIST	Near Fort Collins, Colorado; 40°40′41″N 105°02′48″W	Broadband monopole	10 kW (Note: Time signal article says 2.5 kW)	BCD time code on 100 Hz sub-carrier
5 MHz	WWVH	United States; NIST	Kekaha, Hawaii; 21°59′16″N 159°45′46″W		10 kW	BCD time code on 100 Hz sub-carrier
5 MHz	YVTO	Venezuela	Caracas; 10°30′13″N 66°55′44″W		1 kW	
7.85 MHz	CHU	Canada; NRC	Ottawa, Ontario; 45°17′40″N 75°45′27″W		10 kW	300 baud Bell 103 time code
9.996 MHz	RWM	Russia; VNIIFTRI	Taldom, Moscow; 56°44′58″N 37°38′23″E		10 kW	CW (1 Hz, 10 Hz)
10 MHz	BPM	China; NTSC	Pucheng, Shaanxi; 34°56′56″N 109°32′35″E			(BCD time code on 125 Hz sub-carrier not yet activated); 00:00–24:00 UTC
10 MHz	LOL	Argentina; SHN	Buenos Aires (Note: says that the transmitter is located in Observatorio Naval Buenos Aires at Avenida España 2099, Buenos Aires; on Google Street View, some antenna structures can be seen both on and near the building, however, it's unclear where exactly the specific antenna is located. The coordinates here point to the building itself. 34°37′19″S 58°21′18″W)		1 kW	Observatorio Naval Buenos Aires
10 MHz	WWV	United States; NIST	Near Fort Collins, Colorado; 40°40′41″N 105°02′48″W	Broadband monopole	10 kW	BCD time code on 100 Hz sub-carrier
10 MHz	WWVH	United States; NIST	Kekaha, Hawaii; 21°59′16″N 159°45′46″W		10 kW	BCD time code on 100 Hz sub-carrier
10 MHz	PPE	Brazil	Rio de Janeiro, RJ; 22°53′44″S 43°13′27″W	Horizontal half-wavelength dipole	1 kW	Maintained by National Observatory (Brazil)
14.67 MHz	CHU	Canada; NRC	Ottawa, Ontario; 45°17′40″N 75°45′27″W		3 kW	300 baud Bell 103 time code
14.996 MHz	RWM	Russia; VNIIFTRI	Taldom, Moscow; 56°44′58″N 37°38′23″E		10 kW	CW (1 Hz, 10 Hz)
15 MHz	BPM	China; NTSC	Pucheng, Shaanxi; 34°56′56″N 109°32′35″E			(BCD time code on 125 Hz sub-carrier not yet activated); 01:00–09:00 UTC
15 MHz	WWV	United States; NIST	Near Fort Collins, Colorado; 40°40′41″N 105°02′48″W	Broadband monopole	10 kW	BCD time code on 100 Hz sub-carrier
15 MHz	WWVH	United States; NIST	Kekaha, Hawaii; 21°59′16″N 159°45′46″W		10 kW	BCD time code on 100 Hz sub-carrier
20 MHz	WWV	United States; NIST	Near Fort Collins, Colorado; 40°40′41″N 105°02′48″W	Broadband monopole	2.5 kW	BCD time code on 100 Hz sub-carrier
25 MHz	WWV	United States; NIST	Near Fort Collins, Colorado; 40°40′41″N 105°02′48″W	Broadband monopole	2.0 kW	Schedule: variable (experimental broadcast)
25 MHz	~~MIKES~~	~~Finland~~; ~~MIKES~~	~~Espoo, Finland~~; ~~60°10′49″N 24°49′35″E~~	~~λ/4 sloper antenna~~	~~0.2 kW~~	~~1 kHz amplitude modulation similar to DCF77.~~; As of 2017 the transmission is discontinued until further notice. "MIKES has a transmitter for time code and precise 25 MHz frequency for those near the Helsinki metropolitan area who need precise time and frequency."

Descriptions

Many other countries can receive these signals (JJY can sometimes be received in New Zealand, Western Australia, Tasmania, Southeast Asia, parts of Western Europe and the Pacific Northwest of North America at night), but success depends on the time of day, atmospheric conditions, and interference from intervening buildings. Reception is generally better if the clock is placed near a window facing the transmitter. There is also a propagation delay of approximately 1 ms for every 300 km (190 mi) the receiver is from the transmitter.

==== Clock receivers ====
A number of manufacturers and retailers sell radio clocks that receive coded time signals from a radio station, which, in turn, derives the time from a true atomic clock.

One of the first radio clocks was offered by Heathkit in late 1983. Their model GC-1000 "Most Accurate Clock" received shortwave time signals from radio station WWV in Fort Collins, Colorado. It automatically switched between WWV's 5, 10, and 15 MHz frequencies to find the strongest signal as conditions changed through the day and year. It kept time during periods of poor reception with a quartz-crystal oscillator. This oscillator was disciplined, meaning that the microprocessor-based clock used the highly accurate time signal received from WWV to trim the crystal oscillator. The timekeeping between updates was thus considerably more accurate than the crystal alone could have achieved. Time down to the tenth of a second was shown on an LED display. The GC-1000 originally sold for US$250 in kit form and US$400 preassembled, and was considered impressive at the time. Heath Company was granted a patent for its design.

By 1990, engineers from German watchmaker Junghans had miniaturized this technology to fit into the case of a digital wristwatch. The following year the analog version Junghans Mega with hands was launched.

In the 2000s, radio-based "atomic clocks" became common in retail stores; as of 2010 prices start at around US$15 in many countries. Clocks may have other features such as indoor thermometers and weather station functionality. These use signals transmitted by the appropriate transmitter for the country in which they are to be used. Depending upon signal strength they may require placement in a location with a relatively unobstructed path to the transmitter and need fair to good atmospheric conditions to successfully update the time. Inexpensive clocks keep track of the time between updates, or in their absence, with a non-disciplined quartz-crystal clock, with the accuracy typical of non-radio-controlled quartz timepieces. Some clocks include indicators to alert users to possible inaccuracy when synchronization has not been recently successful.

The United States National Institute of Standards and Technology (NIST) has published guidelines recommending that radio clock movements keep time between synchronizations to within ±0.5 seconds to keep time correct when rounded to the nearest second. Some of these movements can keep time between synchronizations to within ±0.2 seconds by synchronizing more than once spread over a day.

Timepieces with Bluetooth radio support, ranging from watches with basic control of functionality via a mobile app to full smartwatches obtain time information from a connected phone, with no need to receive time signal broadcasts.

=== Other broadcasts ===
Attached to other broadcast stations
Broadcast stations in many countries have carriers precisely synchronized to a standard phase and frequency, such as the BBC Radio 4 longwave service on 198 kHz, and some also transmit sub-audible or even inaudible time-code information, like the Radio France longwave transmitter on 162 kHz. Attached time signal systems generally use audible tones or phase modulation of the carrier wave.

Teletext (TTX)
Digital text pages embedded in television video also provide accurate time. Many modern TV sets and VCRs with TTX decoders can obtain accurate time from Teletext and set the internal clock. However, the TTX time can vary up to 5 minutes.

Many digital radio and digital television schemes also include provisions for time-code transmission.

Digital Terrestrial Television
The DVB and ATSC standards have 2 packet types that send time and date information to the receiver. Digital television systems can equal GPS stratum 2 accuracy (with short term clock discipline) and stratum 1 (with long term clock discipline) provided the transmitter site (or network) supports that level of functionality.

VHF FM Radio Data System (RDS)
RDS can send a clock signal with sub-second precision but with an accuracy no greater than 100 ms and with no indication of clock stratum. Not all RDS networks or stations using RDS send accurate time signals. The time stamp format for this technology is Modified Julian Date (MJD) plus UTC hours, UTC minutes and a local time offset.

L-band and VHF Digital Audio Broadcasting
DAB systems provide a time signal that has a precision equal to or better than Digital Radio Mondiale (DRM) but like FM RDS do not indicate clock stratum. DAB systems can equal GPS stratum 2 accuracy (short term clock discipline) and stratum 1 (long term clock discipline) provided the transmitter site (or network) supports that level of functionality. The time stamp format for this technology is BCD.

Digital Radio Mondiale (DRM)
DRM is able to send a clock signal, but one not as precise as navigation satellite clock signals. DRM timestamps received via shortwave (or multiple hop mediumwave) can be up to 200 ms off due to path delay. The time stamp format for this technology is BCD.

=== Gallery ===
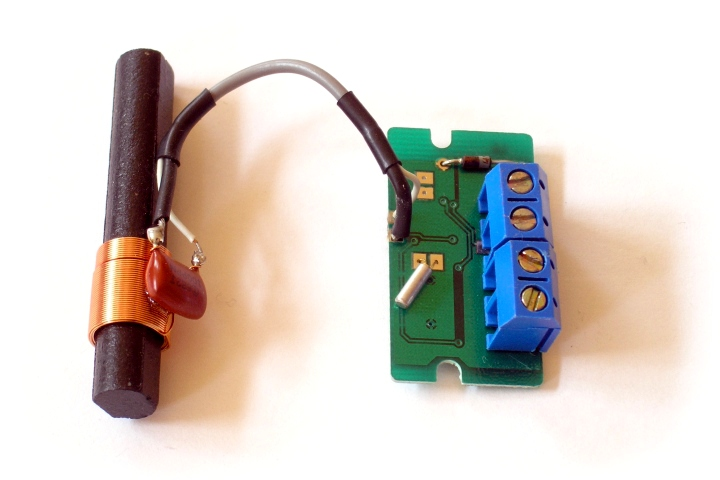
LF time signal receiver

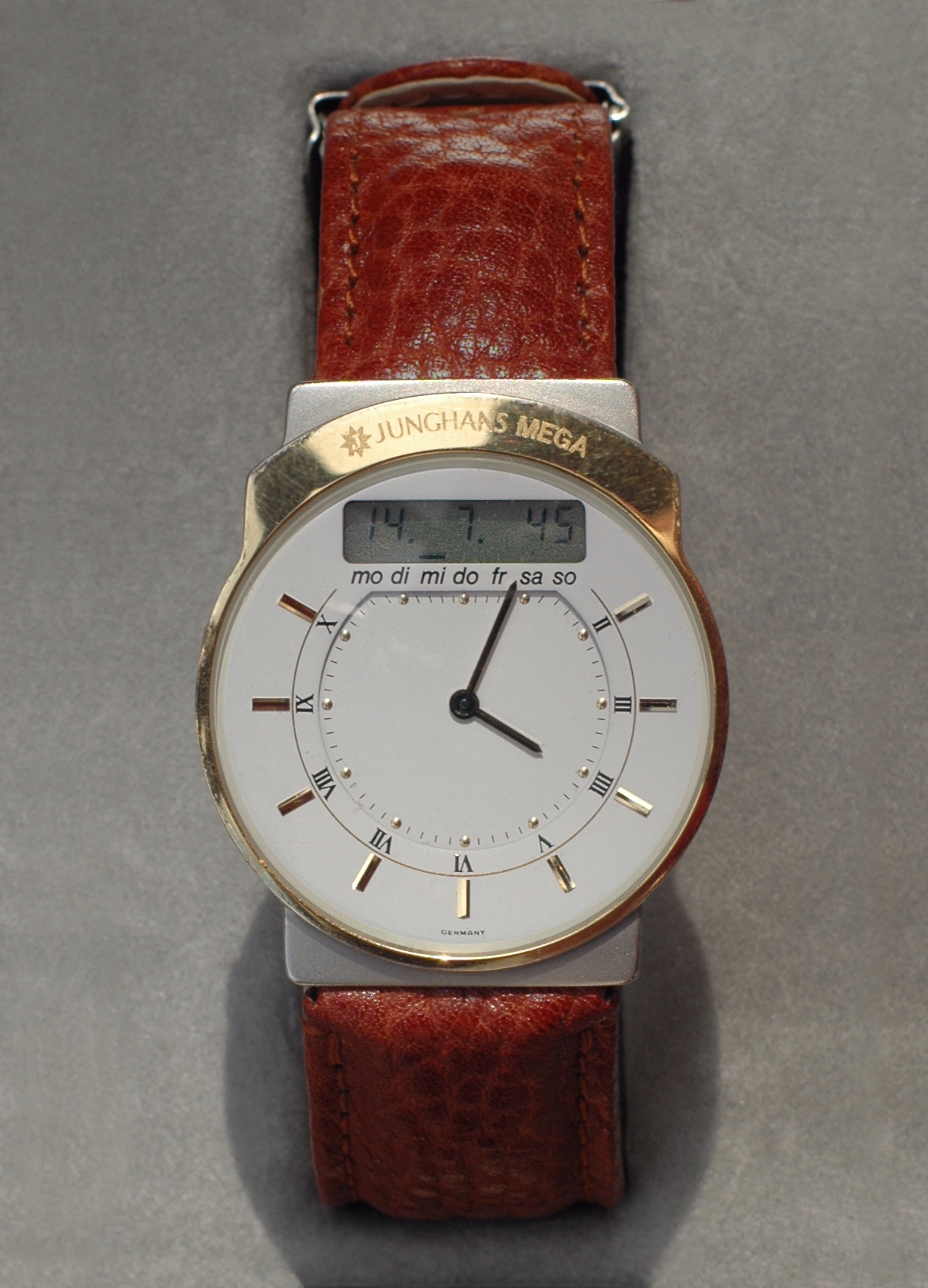
World's first radio clock wrist watch, Junghans Mega (analog model)

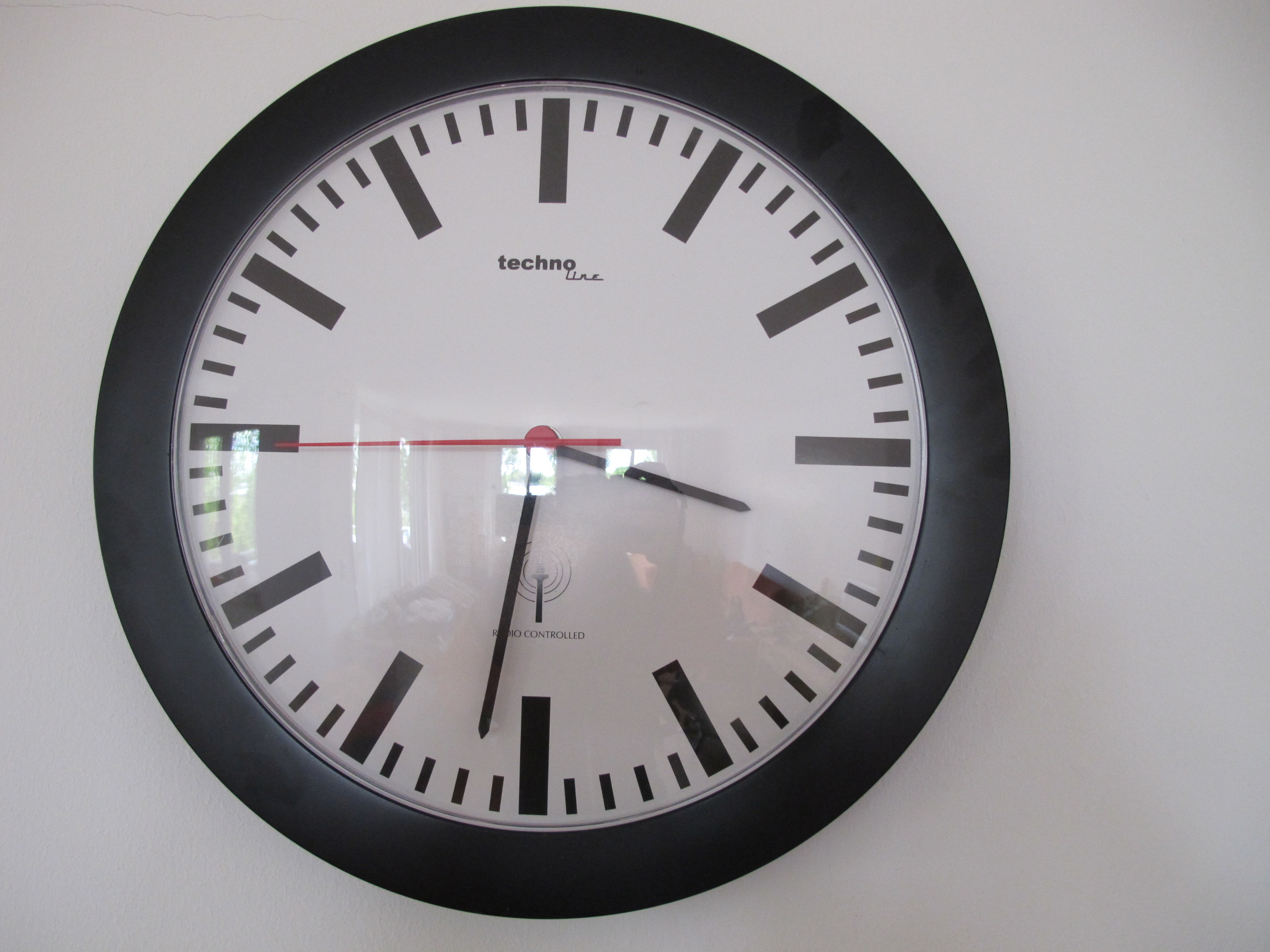
Radio controlled analog wall clock

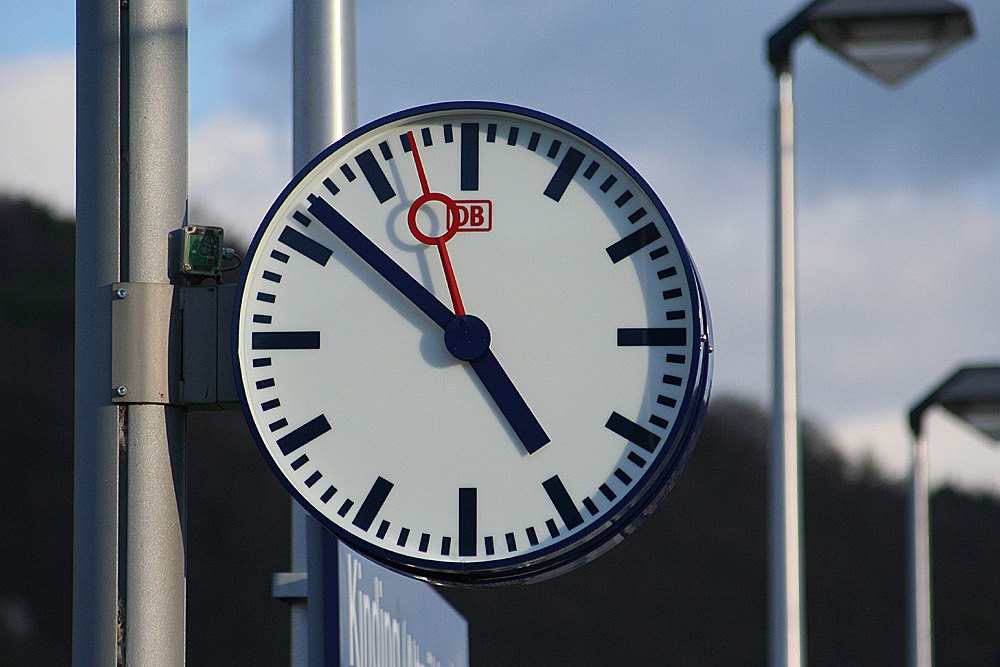
The DCF77 time signal is used by organizations like the Deutsche Bahn railway company to synchronize their station clocks

== Multiple transmitters ==
A radio clock receiver may combine multiple time sources to improve its accuracy. This is what is done in satellite navigation systems such as the Global Positioning System, Galileo, and GLONASS. Satellite navigation systems have one or more caesium, rubidium or hydrogen maser atomic clocks on each satellite, referenced to a clock or clocks on the ground. Dedicated timing receivers can serve as local time standards, with a precision better than 50 ns. The recent revival and enhancement of LORAN, a land-based radio navigation system, will provide another multiple source time distribution system.

=== GPS clocks ===
Many modern radio clocks use satellite navigation systems such as Global Positioning System to provide more accurate time than can be obtained from terrestrial radio stations. These GPS clocks combine time estimates from multiple satellite atomic clocks with error estimates maintained by a network of ground stations. Due to effects inherent in radio propagation and ionospheric spread and delay, GPS timing requires averaging of these phenomena over several periods. No GPS receiver directly computes time or frequency, rather they use GPS to discipline an oscillator that may range from a quartz crystal in a low-end navigation receiver, through oven-controlled crystal oscillators (OCXO) in specialized units, to atomic oscillators (rubidium) in some receivers used for synchronization in telecommunications. For this reason, these devices are technically referred to as GPS-disciplined oscillators.

GPS units intended primarily for time measurement as opposed to navigation can be set to assume the antenna position is fixed. In this mode, the device will average its position fixes. After approximately a day of operation, it will know its position to within a few meters. Once it has averaged its position, it can determine accurate time even if it can pick up signals from only one or two satellites.

GPS clocks provide the precise time needed for synchrophasor measurement of voltage and current on the commercial power grid to determine the health of the system.

=== Astronomy timekeeping ===
Although any satellite navigation receiver that is performing its primary navigational function must have an internal time reference accurate to a small fraction of a second, the displayed time is often not as precise as the internal clock. Most inexpensive navigation receivers have one CPU that is multitasking. The highest-priority task for the CPU is maintaining satellite lock—not updating the display. Multicore CPUs for navigation systems can only be found on high end products.

For serious precision timekeeping, a more specialized GPS device is needed. Some amateur astronomers, most notably those who time grazing lunar occultation events when the moon blocks the light from stars and planets, require the highest precision available for persons working outside large research institutions. The website of the International Occultation Timing Association has detailed technical information about precision timekeeping for the amateur astronomer.

== Daylight saving time ==
Various formats listed above include a flag indicating the status of daylight saving time (DST) in the home country of the transmitter. This signal is typically used by clocks to adjust the displayed time to meet user expectations.

== See also ==
- Casio Wave Ceptor
- Clock network
- Speaking clock
- Standard frequency and time signal service
- Time from NPL
- Time and frequency transfer
- Time synchronization in North America
