= HD210A =

Time signal radio station in Ecuador

HD210A is the callsign of a time signal radio station operated by the Navy of Ecuador. The station is located at Guayaquil, Ecuador and transmits in the HF band on 3.81 and 7.6 MHz.

The transmission is in AM mode with only the lower sideband (part of the time H3E and the rest H2B/H2D) and consists of 780 Hz tone pulses repeated every ten seconds and voice announcements in Spanish.

While sometimes this station is described as defunct, reception reports of this station on 3.81 MHz appear regularly at the Utility DX Forum.

== See also ==
- BPM (time service)
- DCF77
- Time from NPL
- TDF time signal
- RBU (radio station)
- RWM
- YVTO
