= Standard frequency and time signal service =

Radiocommunication service for scientific and other purposes

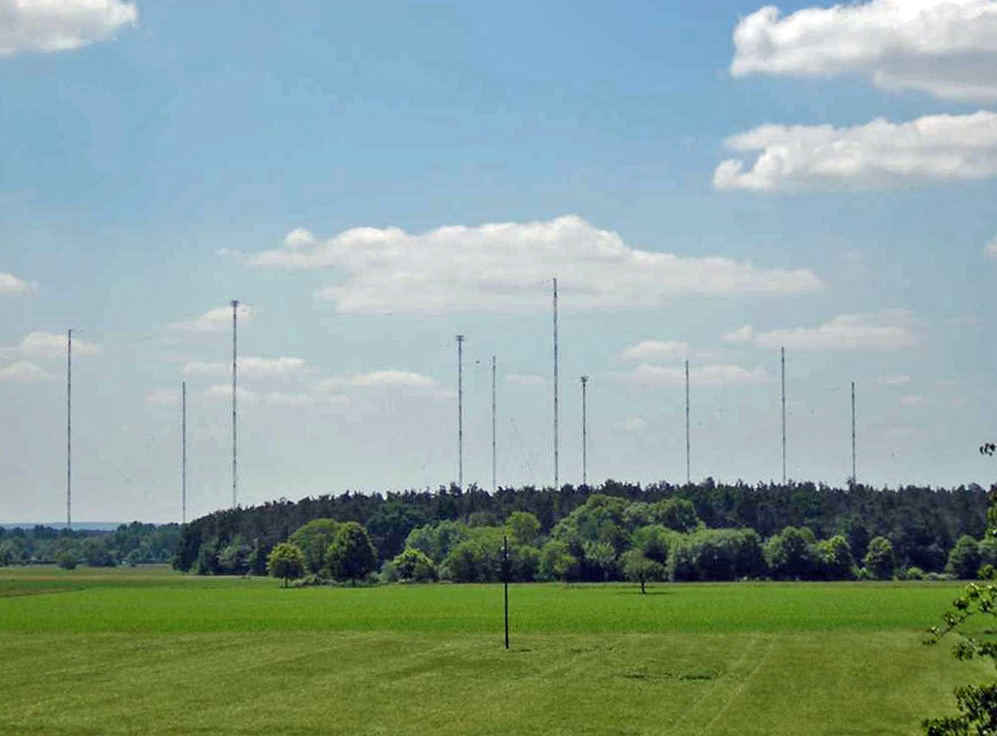
Standard frequency and time signal radio station DCF77

Radiocommunication signal of the time signal transmitter station YVTO

Standard frequency and time signal service (short: SFTS) is, according to Article 1.53 of the International Telecommunication Union's (ITU) Radio Regulations (RR), "A radiocommunication service for scientific, technical and other purposes, providing the transmission of specified frequencies, time signals, or both, of stated high precision, intended for general reception".

== Classification ==
In accordance with ITU Radio Regulations (article 1) variations of this radiocommunication service are classified as follows:
Standard frequency and time signal service (article 1.53)

- Standard frequency and time signal-satellite service

In general this radiocommunication service uses radio stations as follows:

- Standard frequency and time signal stations (article 1.95)

== Standard frequency and time signal-satellite service ==
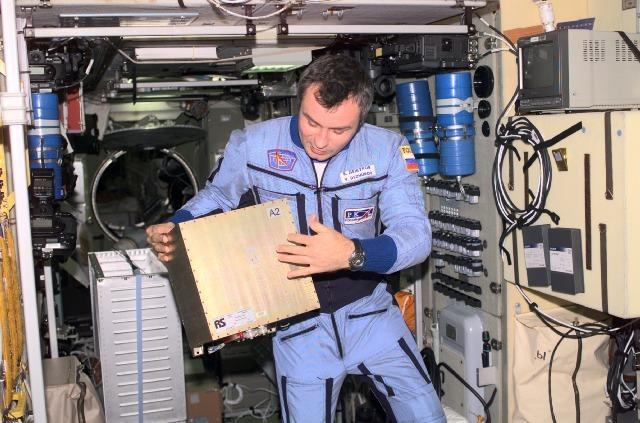
GTS-Module onboard ISS, handled by astronaut Vladimir Dezhurov

Standard frequency and time signal-satellite service (short: SFTSS) is, according to Article 1.54 of the International Telecommunication Union's (ITU) Radio Regulations (RR), defined as a radiocommunication service using space stations on earth satellites for the same purposes as those of the standard frequency and time signal service.

An example to this were experiments of time synchronisation (Global Transmission Services GTS-2) onboard International Space Station. However, in accordance to the ubiquitous availability, GNSS-satellite signals will be used in practice (see also: GPS-disciplined oscillator).

== Frequency allocation ==
The allocation of radio frequencies is provided according to Article 5 of the ITU Radio Regulations (edition 2012).

In order to improve harmonisation in spectrum utilisation, the majority of service-allocations stipulated in this document were incorporated in national Tables of Frequency Allocations and Utilisations which is within the responsibility of the appropriate national administration. The allocation might be primary, secondary, exclusive, and shared.

- primary allocation: is indicated by writing in capital letters (see example below)
- secondary allocation: is indicated by small letters

Example of frequency allocation

Allocation to services
Region 1	Region 2	Region 3
19.95–20.05 MHz STANDARD FREQUENCY AND TIME SIGNAL (20 MHz)
2 498-2 501 MHz STANDARD FREQUENCY AND TIME SIGNAL (2 500 MHz)
4 995–5 003 MHz STANDARD FREQUENCY AND TIME SIGNAL (5 000 MHz)
5 003–5 005 MHz STANDARD FREQUENCY AND TIME SIGNAL Space research
9 995–10 003 MHz STANDARD FREQUENCY AND TIME SIGNAL (10 000 MHz)
10 003–10 005 MHz STANDARD FREQUENCY AND TIME SIGNAL Space research
14 990–15 005 MHz STANDARD FREQUENCY AND TIME SIGNAL (15 000 MHz)
15 005–15 010 MHz STANDARD FREQUENCY AND TIME SIGNAL Space research
19 990–19 995 MHz STANDARD FREQUENCY AND TIME SIGNAL Space research
19 995–20 010 MHz STANDARD FREQUENCY AND TIME SIGNAL (20 000 MHz)
24 990–25 005 MHz STANDARD FREQUENCY AND TIME SIGNAL (25 000 MHz)
25 005–25 010 MHz STANDARD FREQUENCY AND TIME SIGNAL Space research

== Time signals in use ==
The following are the known HF time signal stations currently operational.

Call Sign	Location	Frequencies	Time Signal Provided	Time Signal Format	Notes
ITU-R Standard Frequency and Time Signal services
BPM	Pucheng, China	2.5, 5, 10, & 15 MHz			ITU-R TF.768-5
BSF	Chung-Li, Taiwan, Rep. of China	5 and 15 MHz			
EBC	Cádiz	4.998 MHz			
HLA	Taejon, Republic of Korea	5 MHz			ITU-R TF.768-5
IAM	Rome, Italy	5 MHz			ITU-R TF.768-5
LOL	Buenos Aires, Argentina	5, 10, & 15 MHz			ITU-R TF.768-5
MIKES	Espoo, Finland	25 MHz			
OMA	Prague, Czech Republic	2.5 MHz			Discontinued in 1995
PPE	Rio de Janeiro, Brazil	10 MHz			
RWM	Moscow, Russia	4.996, 9.996, 14.996 MHz			ITU-R TF.768-5
WWV	Fort Collins, Colorado, United States	2.5, 5, 10, 15, & 20 MHz			ITU-R TF.768-5
WWVH	Kekaha, Kauai, Hawaii, United States	2.5, 5, 10, & 15 MHz			ITU-R TF.768-5
YVTO	Caracas, Venezuela	5 MHz			

=== United States ===
The Standard Time and Frequency Signal (STFS) is a Radiocommunication service providing the transmission of specified frequency and time signal, of stated high precision, intended for general reception in the United States and beyond. The radio signals are broadcast on very precise carrier frequencies by the U.S. Naval Observatory and the National Institute of Standards and Technology (NIST), formerly the National Bureau of Standards (NBS). The technical specification of that particular service is in line to the provisions of the International Telecommunication Union's (ITU) Radio Regulations (RR)

== See also ==
- Time synchronization in North America
- Radio Clock
- Time_signal#Radio_time_sources
