= DUT1 =

Time scale with correction

Graph showing the difference in seconds between UT1 and UTC over time. A vertical transition indicates the use of a leap second. The red portion of the graph indicates predicted values.

DUT1 is a time correction equal to the difference between Universal Time (UT1), which is defined by Earth's rotation, and Coordinated Universal Time (UTC), which is defined by a network of precision atomic clocks, with a precision of ±0.1 s.

DUT1 = UT1 − UTC (with a precision of ±0.1 s)

Beginning in 1972, UTC was maintained via leap seconds, such that DUT1 remains within the range −0.9 s < DUT1 < +0.9 s. The reason for this correction is partly that the rate of rotation of the Earth is not constant, due to tidal braking and the redistribution of mass within the Earth, including its oceans and atmosphere, and partly because the SI second (as now used for UTC) was, when adopted, a little shorter than the value of the second of mean solar time at the 2016 adjutment. (Note: (1) In "The Physical Basis of the Leap Second", by D D McCarthy, C Hackman and R A Nelson, in Astronomical Journal, vol.136 (2008), pages 1906–1908, it is stated (page 1908), that "the SI second is equivalent to an older measure of the second of UT1, which was too small to start with and further, as the duration of the UT1 second increases, the discrepancy widens." :(2) In the late 1950s, the cesium standard was used to measure both the current mean length of the second of mean solar time (UT2) (result: 9192631830 cycles) and also the second of ephemeris time (ET) (result: 9192631770±20 cycles), see "Time Scales", by L. Essen, in Metrologia, vol.4 (1968), pp.161–165, on p.162. As is well known, the 9192631770 figure was chosen for the SI second. L Essen in the same 1968 article (p.162) stated that this "seemed reasonable in view of the variations in UT2".)

On 15 October 2026, the General Conference on Weights and Measures (CGPM) voted to increase the maximum permitted DUT1 from 0.9 seconds to 3600 seconds (one hour), effective 20 May 2027, permitting the opportunity to defer leap second decisions for several centuries.

Daily observed values of UT1 − UTC for the past week, and daily forecast values for the coming year, are published by IERS Bulletin A, with more digits than for DUT1. Final values are published in the monthly IERS Bulletin B. DUT1 forecasts are published in IERS Bulletin D.

Several time signal services broadcast values of DUT1. CHU (Canada), HLA (South Korea), MSF (United Kingdom), and WWV (United States) transmit DUT1 with 0.1 s precision. In Russia, RWM, RTZ and the longwave RBU transmit DUT1 with 0.1 s precision and an additional correction dUT1 in 0.02 s increments.

== See also ==
- ΔT – Measure of variation of solar time from atomic time
