= Time synchronization in North America =

Time synchronization in North America can be achieved with many different methods, some of which require only a telephone, while others require expensive, sensitive, and rare electronic equipment. In the United States, the United States Naval Observatory provides the standard of time, called UTC(USNO), for the United States military and the Global Positioning System, while the National Institute of Standards and Technology provides the standard of time for civil purposes in the United States, called UTC(NIST).

== ITU-R Standard Frequency and Time Signals ==
A standard frequency and time signal service is a station that operates on or immediately adjacent to 2.5 MHz, 5 MHz, 10 MHz, 15 MHz, 20 MHz, and 25 MHz, as specified by Article 5 of the ITU Radio Regulations (edition 2012). The US service is provided by radio stations WWV (Colorado) and WWVH (Hawaii).

The methods below provide either Coordinated Universal Time (UTC), which is defined by Recommendation ITU-R TF.460, or the official U.S. implementation of UTC, officially labeled UTC (NIST).

== Internet time sources ==
Several different time synchronization protocols exist on the Internet, including:

Protocol	RFCs	Accuracy	Ports	Time servers
Daytime Protocol	RFC 868	Nearest second	TCP port 13	
Time Protocol (a.k.a. NETDATE)	RFC 868	Nearest second	TCP/UPD part 37	
NTP	RFC 1305, RFC 5905			
SNTP	RFC 1769, RFC 2030			
ICMP TIMESTAMP	RFC 0792, page 16			
IP TIMESTAMP option	RFC 0791, 3.1, page 16			

== GPS time synchronization ==
GPS receiver requirements

- Minimum: GPS receiver that works with user chosen software; this requires some combination of GPGGA, GPRMC, GPZDA, GPGSA, and GPGSV sentences. This provides accuracy of between 1 and 2 seconds, and includes most, but not all modern GPS receivers.
- Better: USB GPS receiver with the NMEA 0183 GPZDA sentence sent at least once a second. The developer of the Windows software NMEATime2 recommends GPS units with the U-blox 7 receiver, and this software uses a control loop to analyze the text of the GPS timing sentence, and claims to achieve 1 ms accuracy with the technique.
- Better yet: RS-232 GPS receiver with the NMEA 0183 GPZDA sentence sent at least once a second, plus a 1PPS signal on DCD (1 μs accuracy possible with a real RS-232 port not on the USB bus; 1 ms possible with a RS-232 to USB adapter). The Garmin GPS 18x LVC appears to be the only such device that is generally available to consumers, but this then needs an external 5 V DC power source.
- Best: Higher accuracy is possible with a high-end GPS receiver designed for time signal use, but these are very expensive (around $1000), feature OCXOs (oven-controlled crystal oscillators), and often require special software and physical RS-232 ports not connected via a USB bus to achieve that accuracy.

== Utility frequency ==
In 2009 the Federal Energy Regulatory Commission made time error correction (TEC) of the power grid frequency mandatory. While TEC does not provide full synchronization (date and time) and synchronization is lost in case of a power outage it provides an inexpensive way to maintain high long term accuracy of synchronous clocks found in most household appliances. Once the initial time is set the power grid will typically maintain the accuracy within 10 seconds relative to UTC by adjusting frequency.

== All time sources ==
Several different organizations provide publicly accessible recorded voice time sources, including the NIST Telephone Time of Day Service, see speaking clock. Other sources include GPS, terrestrial radio time signals, and internet services, as listed below.

North American Time Synchronization Sources
Time Signal	Time Provided	Accuracy	Source	Signal Format	Hardware Requirements	Linux/Unix Software	Windows Software
GPS	UTC(USNO)		1575.42 MHz	NMEA 0183 sentences, 1PPS signal.	Minimum: GPS receiver that works with one's chosen software; this requires some combination of GPGGA, GPRMC, GPZDA, GPGSA, and GPGSV, sentences. Ideal: GPS receiver (OCXO/DOCXO disciplined clock preferred) with NMEA 0183 output on RS-232 or USB, with GPZDA sentence sent at least once a second, and 1PPS signal on DCD, which includes at least these devices: ZTI Z050 GPS dongle; Garmin GPS 18x OEM	Gpsd plus ntpd with the GPSD NG client driver	NMEATime2; COAA's GPSTime; F6CTE's CLOCK; ToyNTP; BktTimeSync by IZ2BKT
WWVB	UTC(NIST)		60 kHz AM	IRIG "H" PWM time code with PM BPSK signal overlaid.	Radio-controlled clock: NIST list of receivers; AC-100-WWVB Time Receiver; AC-500-MSF Time Receiver		ClockWatch Radio Sync; F6CTE's CLOCK
WWV	UTC(NIST)		2.5, 5, 10, 15, and 20 MHz AM	Voice with modified IRIG-Hformat time code on 100 Hz sub-carrier (CCIR code)	HF radio and antenna (plus software if automatic updating of computer time is desired); TrueTime TL-3 WWV Receiver	ntpd with Radio WWV Audio Demodulator/Decoder (driver can tune ICOM HF radios via C-IV)	COAA's Radio Clock; F6CTE's CLOCK
WWVH	UTC(NIST)		5, 10, and 15 MHz AM	Voice with modified IRIG-Hformat time code on 100 Hz sub-carrier (CCIR code)	HF radio and antenna (plus software if automatic updating of computer time is desired); TrueTime TL-3 WWV Receiver	ntpd with Radio WWV Audio Demodulator/Decoder (driver can tune ICOM HF radios via C-IV)	COAA's Radio Clock; F6CTE's CLOCK
CHU			3.33 MHz, 7.85 MHz, 14.67 MHz	Bell 103 modem tones, decodable by most computer modems		ntpd with Radio CHU Audio Demodulator/Decoder driver (driver can tune ICOM HF radios via C-IV)	COAA's Radio Clock; F6CTE's CLOCK
Daytime Protocol	UTC (variant depends on server's time source)						ClockWatch Pro for Windows
Time Protocol	UTC (variant depends on server's time source)						ClockWatch Pro for Windows
Network Time Protocol	UTC (variant depends on server's time source)		pool.ntp.org		Computer with NTP client that syncs at least once an hour.	ntpd, sntp, ntpdate	Meinberg NTP; NetTime; ToyNTP; BktTimeSync by IZ2BKT
NTPSec	UTC (variant depends on server's time source)						
Precision Time Protocol	UTC (variant depends on server's time source)						Domain Time II
NIST Telephone Time of Day Service	UTC(NIST)		+1-303-499-7111; +1-808-335-4363	Voice announcement with sync pips.	Telephone connection, ear	n/a	Manual sync only.
NIST Automated Computer Time Service (ACTS)			+1-303-494-4774; +1-808-335-4721		Windows computer with dialup modem.	ntpd with NIST/USNO/PTB Modem Time Services driver	ClockWatch Pro for Windows
USNO Master Clock modem time			+1-202-762-1594		Computer with Bell 212A or CCITT V.22 compatible modem	ntpd with NIST/USNO/PTB Modem Time Services driver	
US Naval Observatory time service	UTC(USNO)		+1-202-762-1401; +1-202-762-1069 (Washington, D.C.); +1-719-567-6742 (Colorado Springs)		ear	n/a	

== See also ==
- Time signal
- Atomic clock
- Network Time Protocol
- Radio clock
- List of radio time signal stations
- WWV (radio station)
- WWVH
- WWVB
- Extended Data Services (XDS "Time-of-Day Packet")
- Standard frequency and time signal service
- Coordinated Universal Time
- List of UTC timing centers
- Time and frequency transfer
- Synchronization
- Time synchronization over radio
