= RTZ =

RTZ may refer to:

- RTZ (radio station), a radio time signal station in Irkutsk, Russia
- RTZ (band), an American rock band
- Return-to-zero, a signaling protocol that returns to its "zero" state between tokens
- Return to Zork, a 1993 adventure game in the Zork series
- Rio Tinto (corporation) (previously the Rio Tinto – Zinc Corporation), a British-Australian multinational metals and mining corporation
- RTZ, a 2009 compilation album by Six Organs of Admittance

== See also ==
- Arteezy (born 1996), a Canadian professional Dota 2 player
