= Tophane Clock Tower =

Coordinates: 40°11′15″N 29°03′27″E

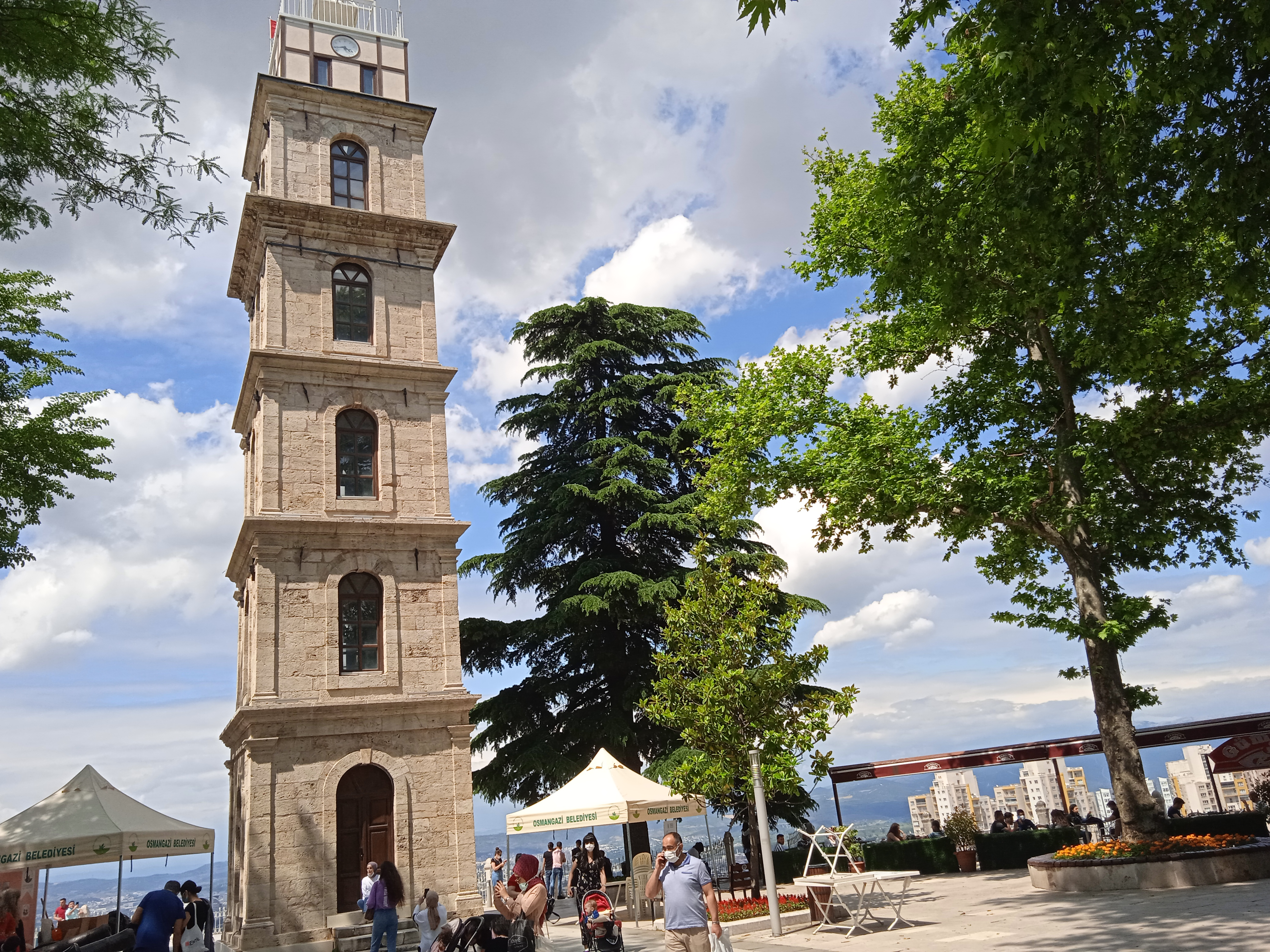
The Tophane Clock Tower.

The Tophane Clock Tower (Turkish: Tophane Saat Kulesi) is a clock tower in Bursa, Turkey. It has six floors and is 33m in height. The tower currently has a radio clock and is used as a fire lookout station.

There was a different clock tower in the place of the current one, which was destroyed in an unknown date. The construction of the current tower began on 2 August 1904 and was finished on 31 August 1905.
