= Time in Venezuela =

Time zone of Venezuela

UTC-04:00, yellow indicates areas where it is followed all year

Venezuela uses the UTC−04:00 time offset. The country used UTC−04:30 from 9 December 2007 until 30 April 2016. The time zone is commonly called Venezuelan Standard Time (VET), and legally referred to as Hora Legal de Venezuela (HLV) or Venezuela's Legal Time. The HLV is administered by the Navigation and Hydrography Service, in the Cagigal Naval Observatory, Caracas.

The official time zone of Venezuela is determined by meridian 60° west of Greenwich, UK.

UTC−04:30 was the official time zone in Venezuela from 1912 to 1965, when the government changed it in order to adopt meridian 60° UTC−04:00 time, which passes through Punta de Playa, Delta Amacuro State. It was changed again to UTC−04:30 from 2007 to 2016.

== Background ==
Venezuela's Legal Time Service was founded to answer the need for a standard time across the country, located approximately between meridians 60° W and 75° W, corresponding to UTC−04:00 and UTC−05:00 with respect to the prime meridian. In 1912, the meridian 67° 30' W was adopted as the first geographical reference for a national time system. The HLV was given to the National Telegraphy Central Office as an astronomical time standard, corresponding to GMT−04:30. During the 1930s, the broadcasting services began time reports synchronized with the HLV. In 1965 the Republic of Venezuela Congress established meridian 60° W, near Punta de Playa in Delta Amacuro state, as official, since the previous one did not fulfill the international requirement for time standards of being based on integer differences with Greenwich Mean Time (GMT). Beginning then, Venezuela Standard Time was UTC−04:00; this meant the addition of thirty minutes to the previous time. This modification was carried out based on research from the La Electricidad de Caracas (Caracas Electricity) Company. The results indicated that adding thirty minutes to the previous time would save energy use, since all morning activities were going to be carried out in the presence of sunlight, and there would be an additional half an hour of sunlight in the afternoons.

== Current standard time ==
In December 2007, President Hugo Chávez changed, via decree, the official meridian to meridian 67° 30' W, the same used between 1912 and 1965. As result, the standard time was UTC−04:30, half an hour behind the previous time which eventually led to an increase in energy consumption.

On 15 April 2016, President Nicolás Maduro announced that Venezuela would reverse Chávez's time change due to a shortage of electricity (the country's hydroelectric power had been hit by low water levels) in Venezuela, with a return to UTC−04:00 which began on 1 May 2016 at 03:00:00.

== IANA time zone database ==
The IANA time zone database contains one zone for Venezuela in the file zone.tab, named America/Caracas.

c.c.	coordinates*	TZ*	Comments	Standard time	Summer time
VE	+1030−06656	America/Caracas		−04:00	—N/a
