= Junghans Mega =

1991 analogue radio time-sync wristwatch

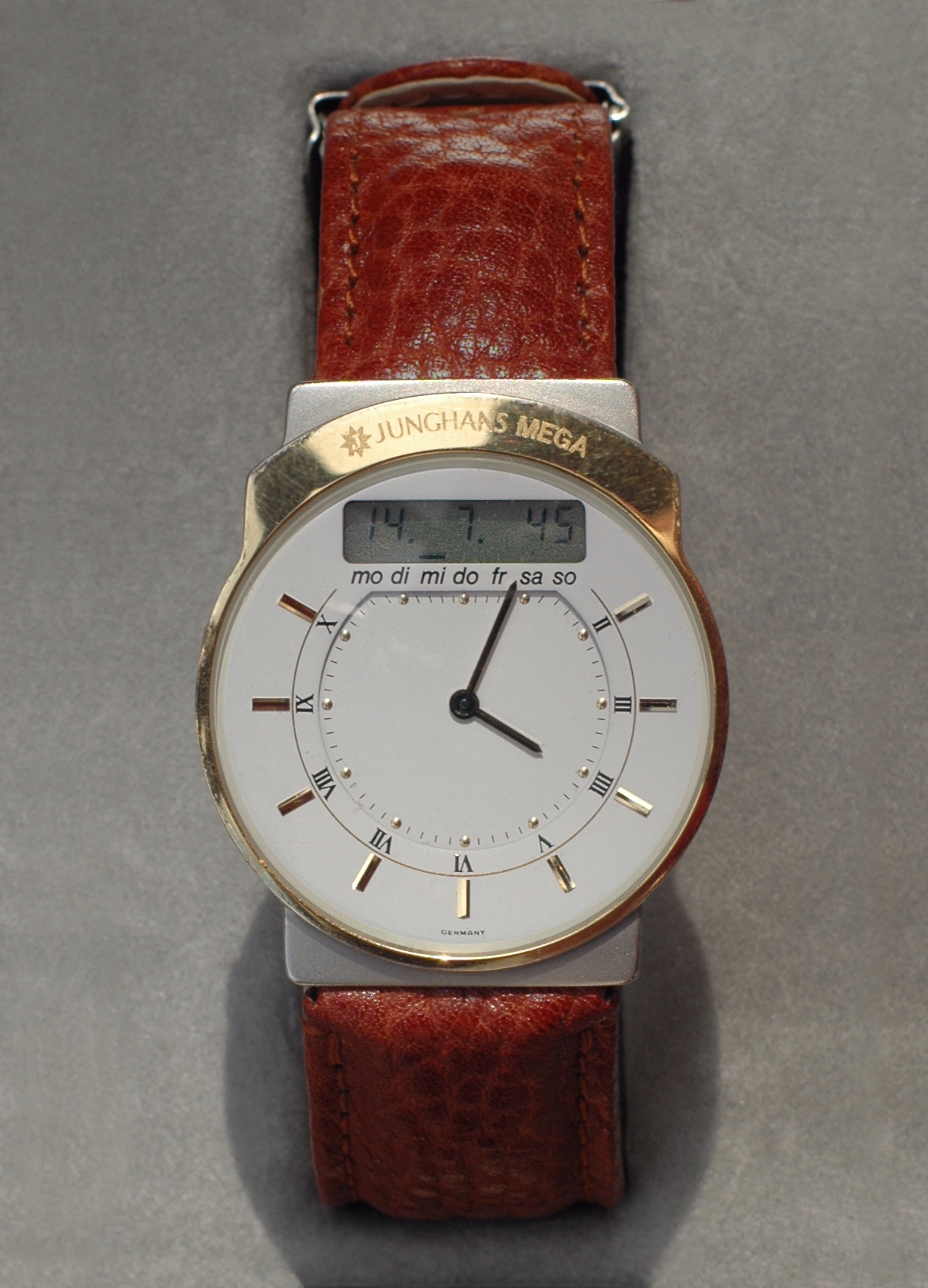
First analogue radio-controlled wristwatch worldwide, Junghans Mega, 1991

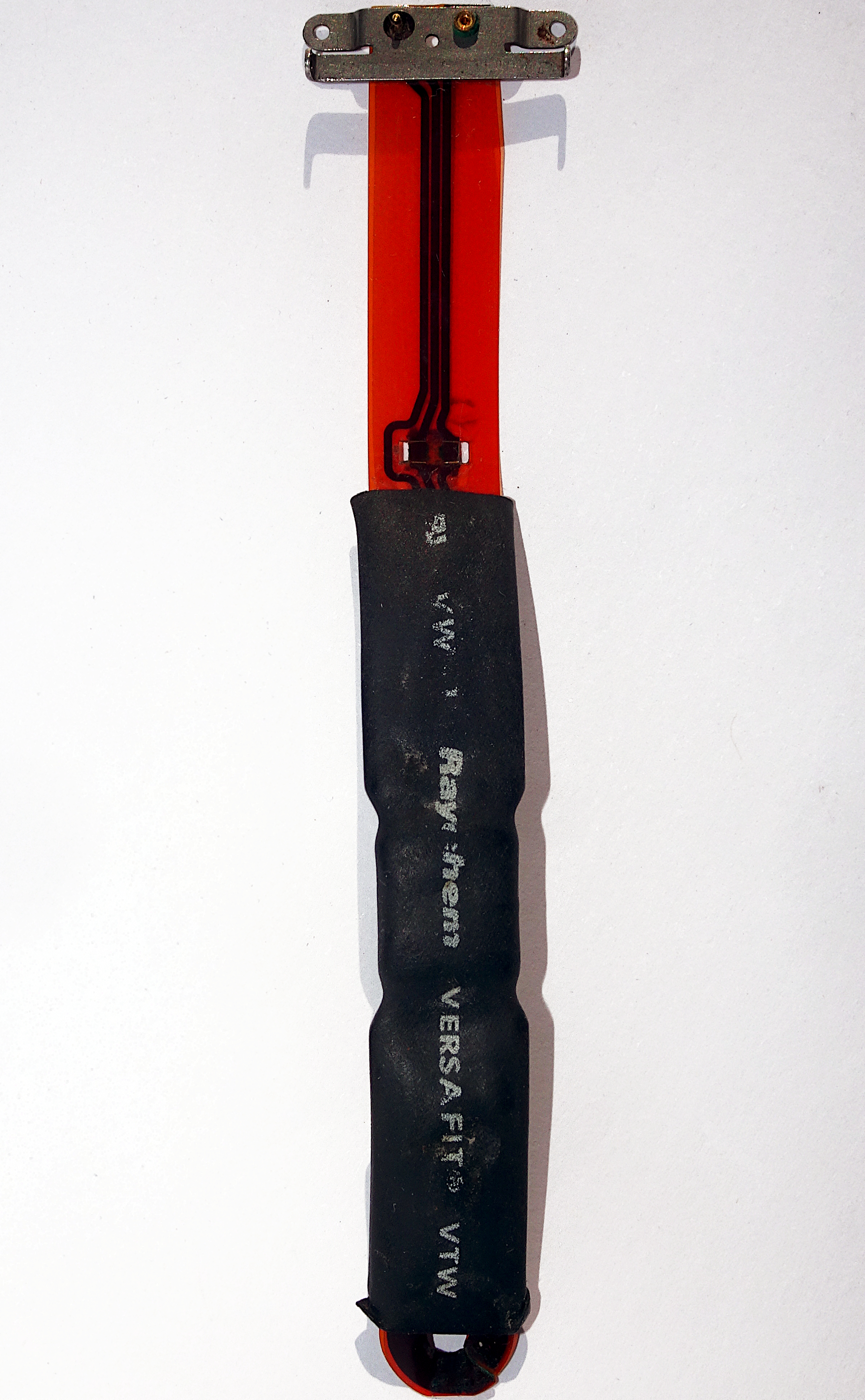
Wristband antenna of the Junghans Mega, designed to receive the DCF77 time signal transmitter

The Junghans Mega was "the world's first radio-controlled wristwatch with hands" (analog watch) in 1991. It was produced by the German watchmaker Junghans, who had already introduced a digital radio clock called Mega 1 to the market in 1990.

== Overview ==
=== Description ===
The Junghans MEGA has a stainless steel case with partial gold overlay. The white dial with two gold hands and a rectangular LCD display is protected by a circular, scratch-resistant mineral glass. The antenna for receiving the time signal from the DCF77 transmitter in Mainflingen is housed in a leather strap (brown or black) with a folding clasp. The watch is equipped with time zone setting, perpetual calendar (day of the week, date, month), digital second, internal time memory, reception control display, and transmitter call button.

=== Technical specifications ===
"The Junghans MEGA watch receives long wave time telegrams (77.5 kHz) from the official German standard ... time signal transmitter DCF77" with a wristband antenna. This allows for Europe-wide reception within a 1,500 km radius. The clock is synchronised daily with an atomic clock from the Physikalisch-Technische Bundesanstalt in order to display the official time in Germany as accurately as possible.

A time synchronization with the transmitter is performed at 2:00 and 3:00 a.m. In case of reception issues, the synchronization is repeated every hour until 6:00 a.m. This ensures that the time accuracy is 1 second in 1 million years.

The movement is a quartz mechanism of the w605 type with a quartz time base of 32 kHz and a light barrier for hand position control. The power supply comes from a lithium metal battery in the form of a button cell with 3V nominal voltage.

== History ==
In 1985, Junghans introduced the first radio-controlled table clock to the market.

By 1990, Junghans engineers had miniaturized this technology to fit into the case of the digital wristwatch MEGA 1. The following year, in 1991, Junghans launched the analog version MEGA with hands.

In 1994, there was "another premiere: Junghans presented the first radio-controlled watch for women."

In 2025, the Junghans watch factory still produces Mega radio-controlled watches.
