= Junghans =

German watch manufacturer

Coordinates: 48°13′21″N 8°22′44″E

- Company type: GmbH & Co. KG
- Industry: Watch manufacturing
- Founded: 1861
- Headquarters: Schramberg, Germany
- Key people: Matthias Stotz (CEO)
- Products: Wristwatches, accessories
- Website: www.junghans.de

Junghans Uhren GmbH is a German watch and clock manufacturer. The company is located in the district of Rottweil, in the town of Schramberg, Baden-Württemberg, southwest Germany.

In 1903, Junghans was the largest watch factory in the world and in 1956 it was the third largest chronometer manufacturer right behind Rolex and Omega.

The company is owned by businessman and CDU-politician Hans-Jochem Stein.

== History ==
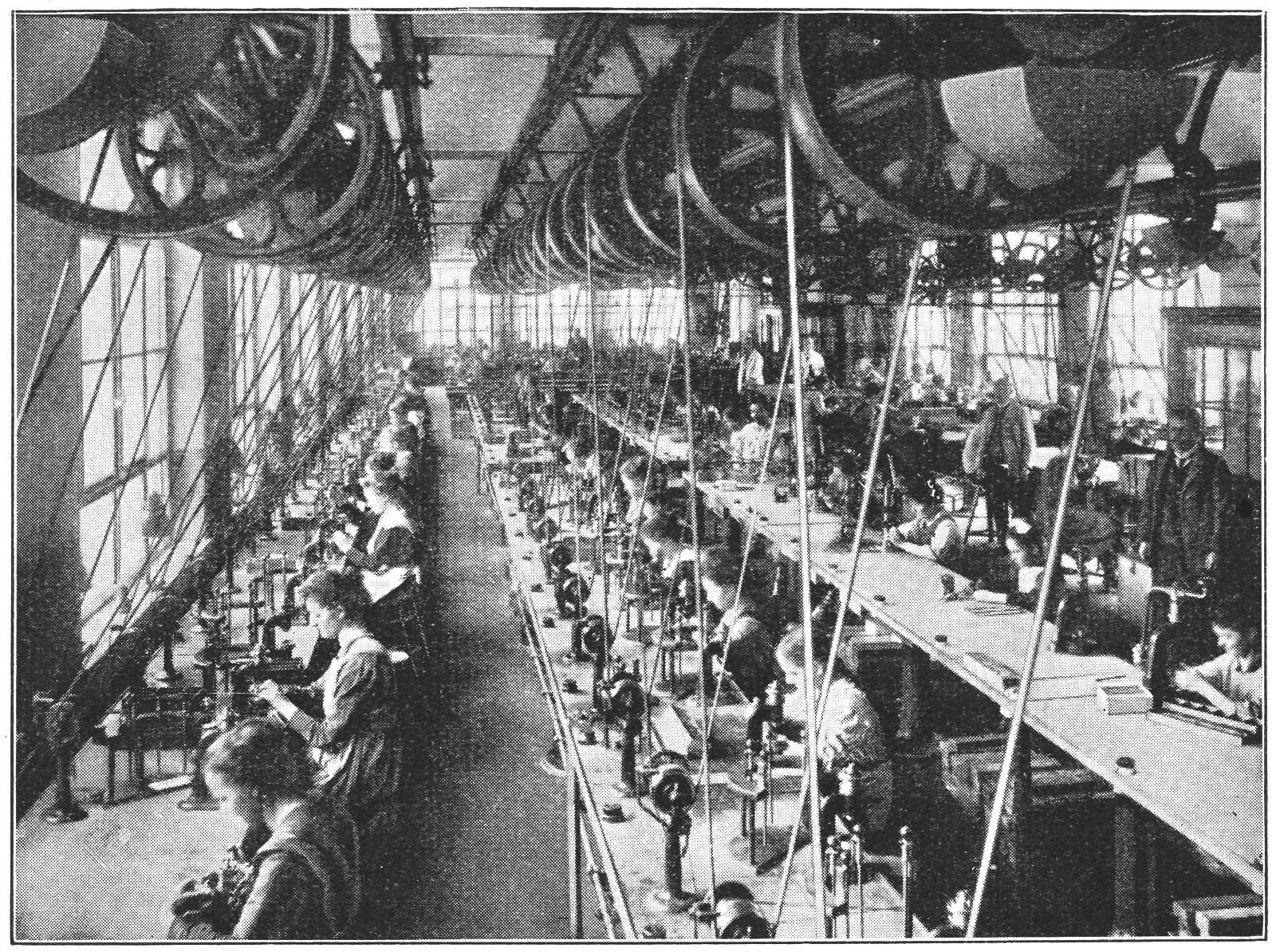
Junghans factory in 1925

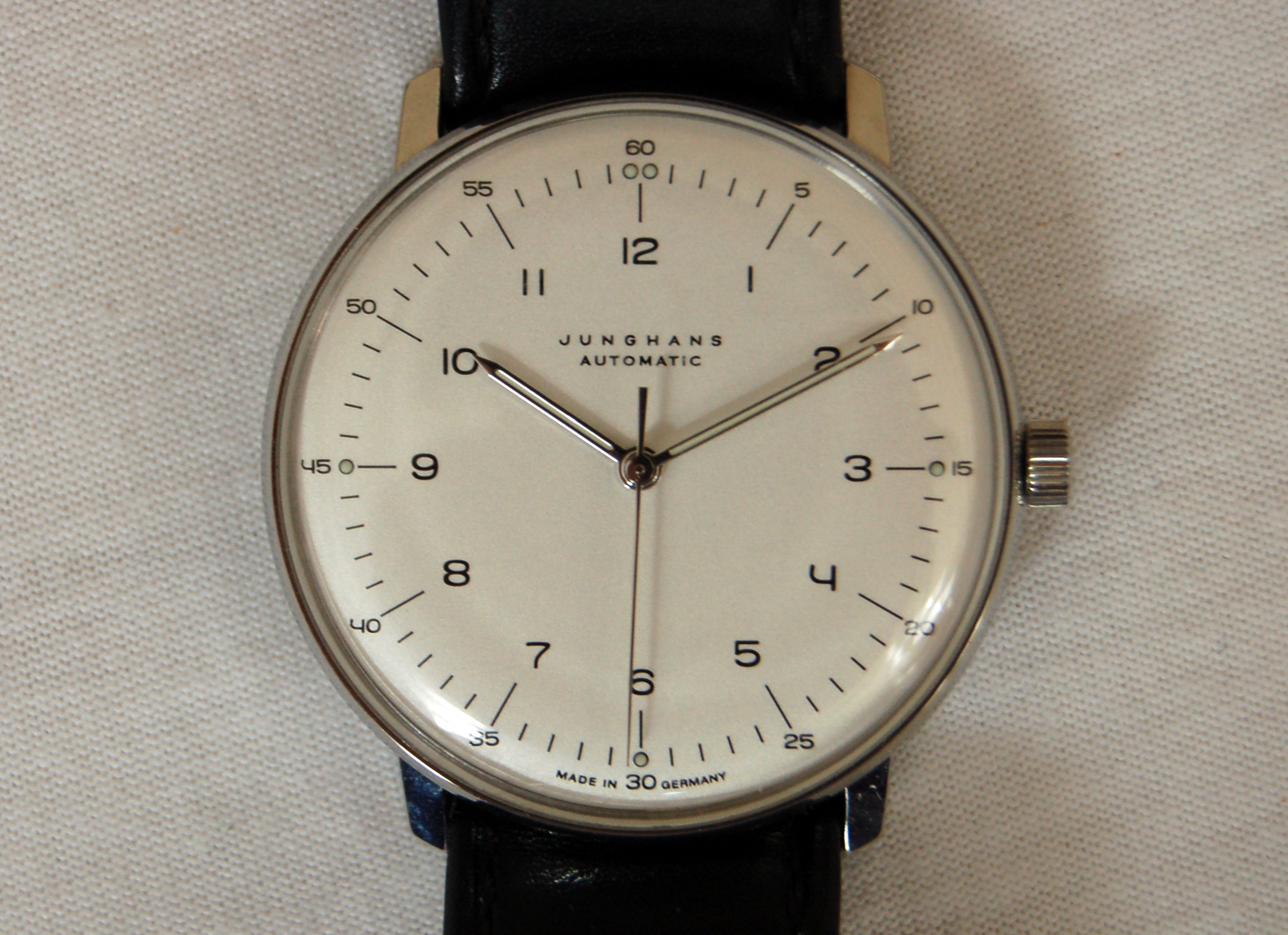
A Junghans wrist watch, designed by Max Bill in the early 1960s

On 15 April 1861 Erhard Junghans created the company Junghans und Tobler together with his brother-in-law Jakob Zeller-Tobler in Schramberg. In 1866, shortly before Erland Junghans died and his wife Luise took over the company, the first Junghans watches appeared. She was succeeded by her sons, Erhard Jr. and Arthur, the latter of whom spent much time in the United States, where he learned innovative American production techniques that enabled the company to market affordable and popular timepieces to the German public. The USA was also the inspiration for the five-pointed star as the Junghans logo, shortly to be replaced by an eight-pointed star, intended to symbolize a gear wheel, which is still in use. By the year 1903, Junghans had the largest watch and clock factory, with over 3000 employees.

The company began to produce wristwatches in 1927, and over the following decades created clocks and watches for the civilian market and the German air force. Beginning in the 1950s, the Bauhaus-trained designer Max Bill created products for the firm, notably the teardrop-shaped "Kitchen Clock with Timer", which can be found in the collection of The Museum of Modern Art, and followed by a series of watches, the first of which launched in 1961. The relationship between Junghans and Bill lasted many years, and the company has continued to release new models based on his work. Many of the firm's best-selling watches today are based on those designed by Bill.

The company served as the official timekeeper for the 1972 Summer Olympics in Munich. In the late 1980s, Junghans introduced the first radio-controlled table clock on the world market. In 1990 the first radio-controlled wristwatch, called the MEGA 1, followed, designed by Hartmut Esslinger and his firm Frog Design. In 1995 Junghans presented a solar-powered watch with ceramic housing. Together with the Japanese firm Seiko, Junghans developed a globally-oriented wristwatch that automatically sets the local time in respective time zones.

Junghans had been owned by Egana Goldpfeil from Hong Kong since the 1990s. In 2008, Egana Goldpfeil and Junghans went bankrupt. The Schramberg business man and politician Hans-Jochem Stein acquired the company with the 85 employees.

== Junghans defence industry ==
The Junghans Microtec GmbH was a division of Junghans Uhren GmbH founded in the mid-1980s, which was formally spun out into a separate legal entity in 1999, and produces fuze-technology for artillery, mortar, medium-calibre, tanks, anti-tank and cruise missiles. Junghans Microtec is located in the small town of Dunningen-Seedorf, close to Schramberg. The company produces fuses for 76 mm to 203 mm artillery. The small German tank Wiesel AWC uses the Junghans fuse MFZ/M as a standard performance.

According to a leaked diplomatic cable, the production facilities of Junghans Microtec GmbH would be endangered by terrorist attacks.

== Junghans timepieces (gallery) ==
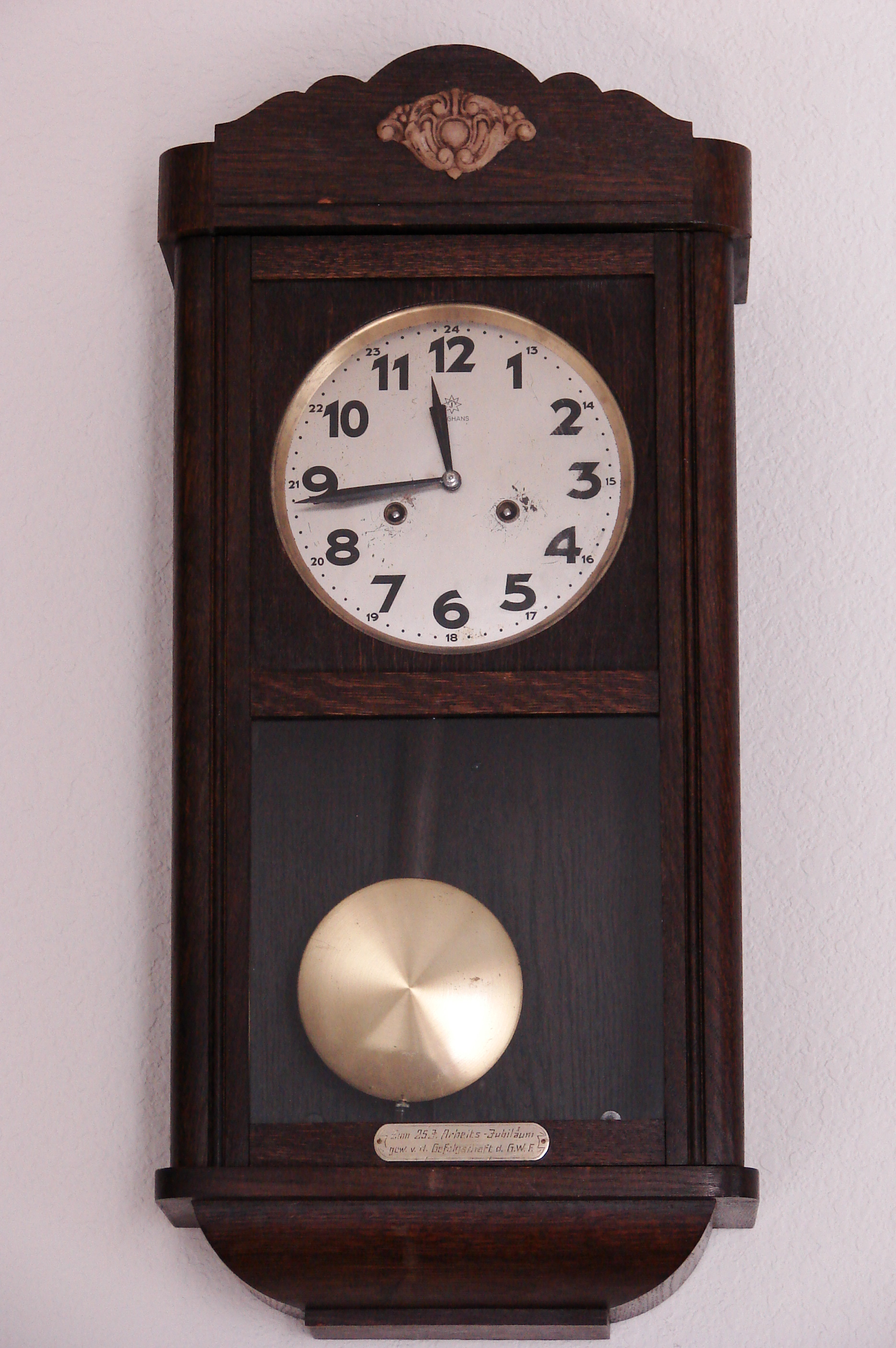
Pendulum box clock
c. mid 1920s

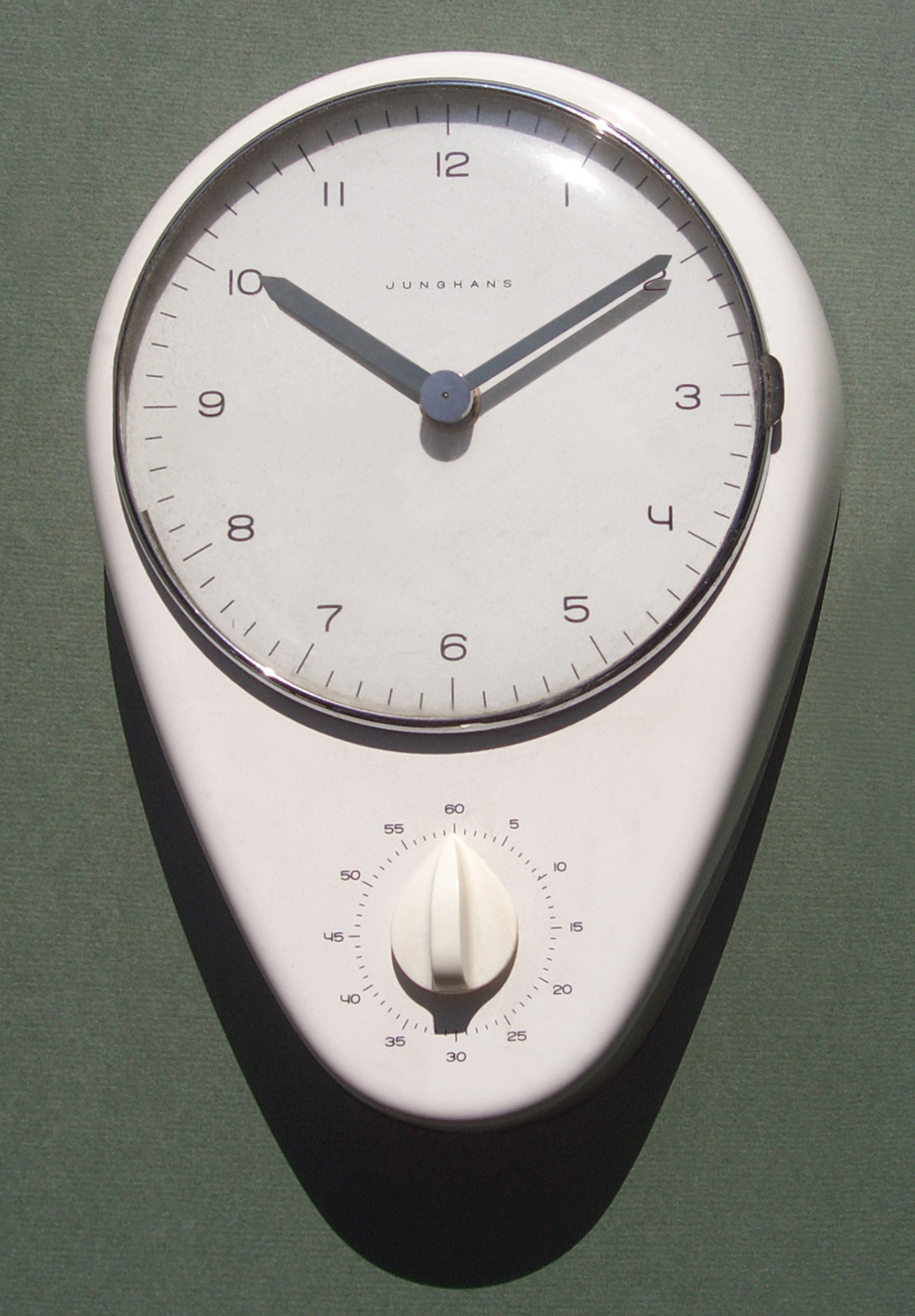
Junghans kitchen clock, 1956

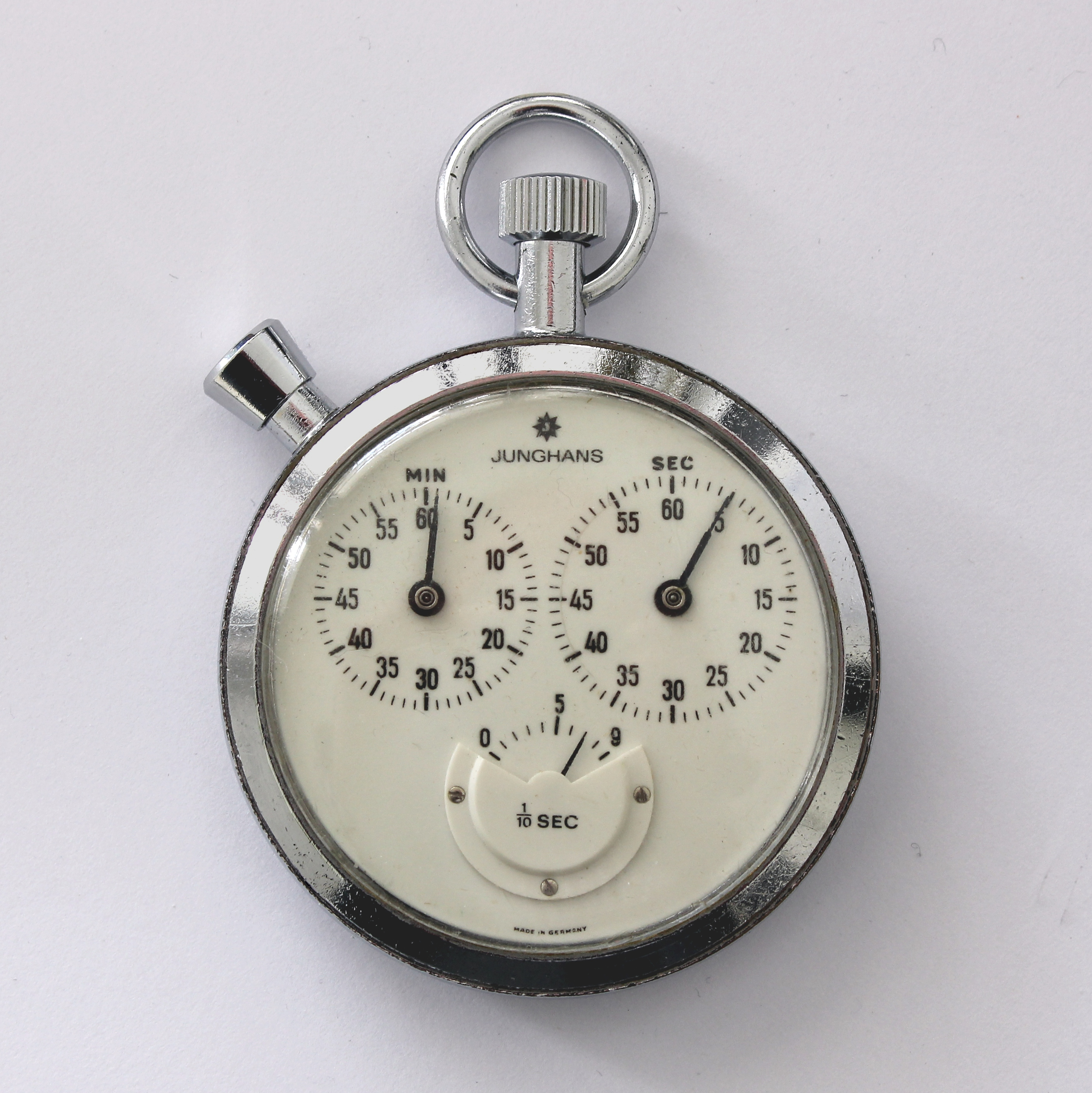
Stopwatch, 1960s

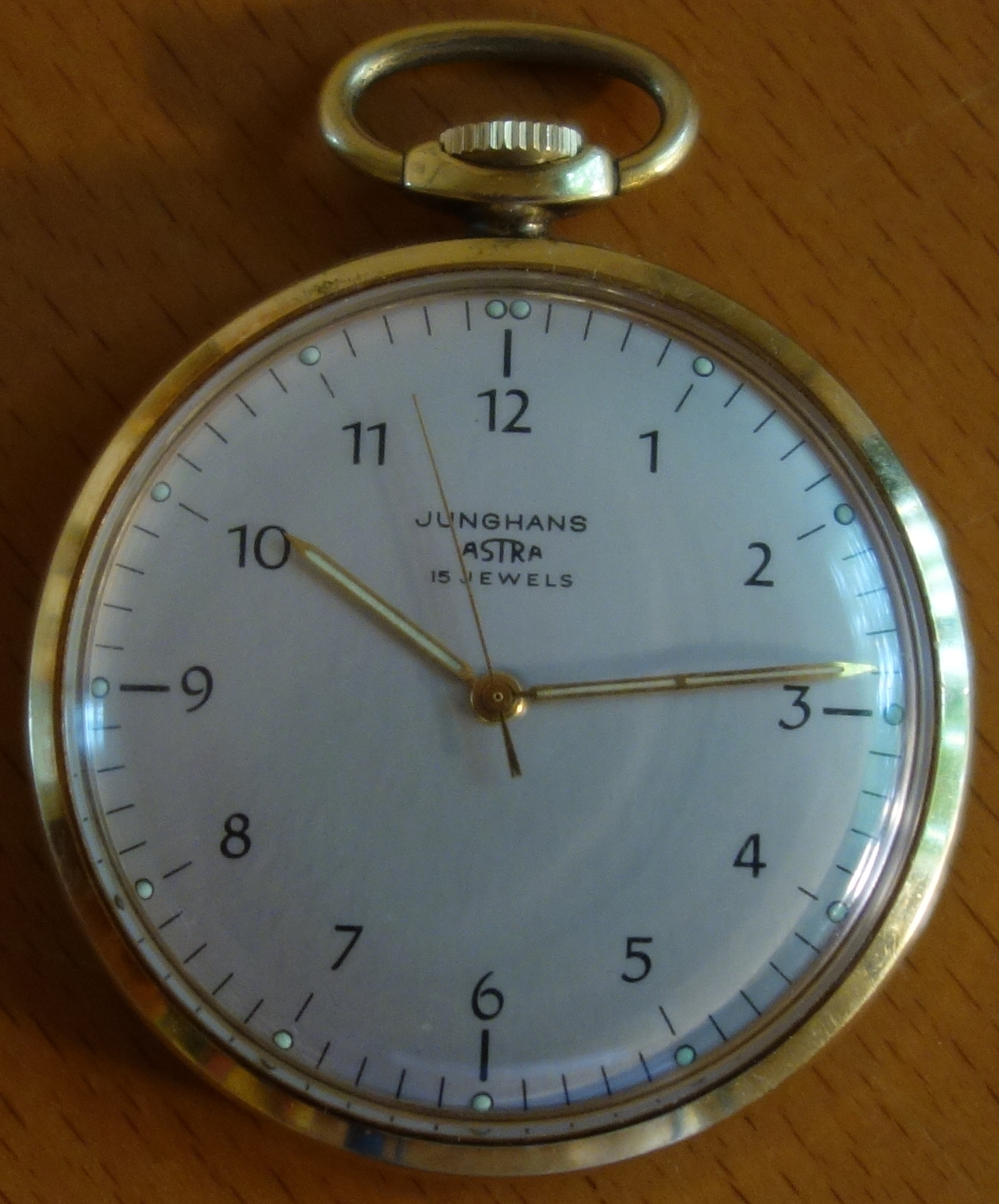
Pocketwatch "Junghans Astra", 1960s

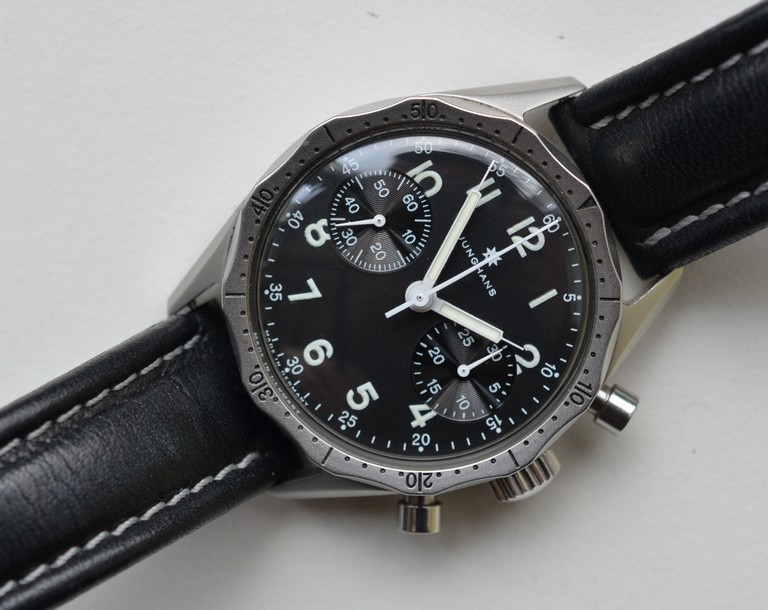
Junghans watch designed for the German Bundeswehr, first issued late 1950s

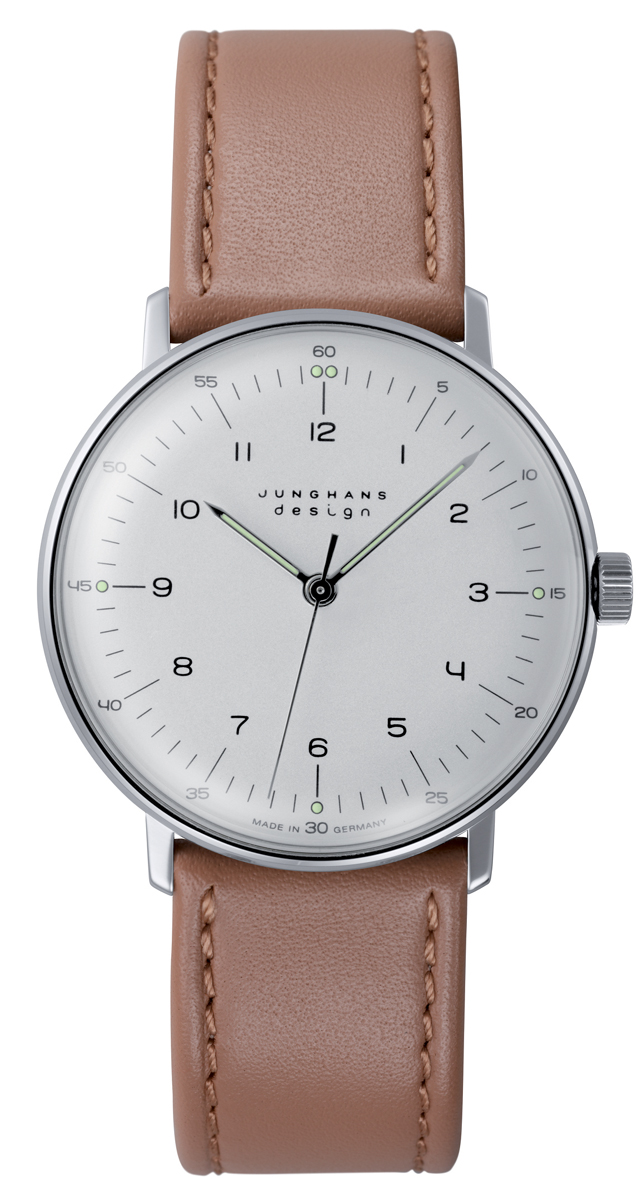
Junghans watch designed by Max Bill

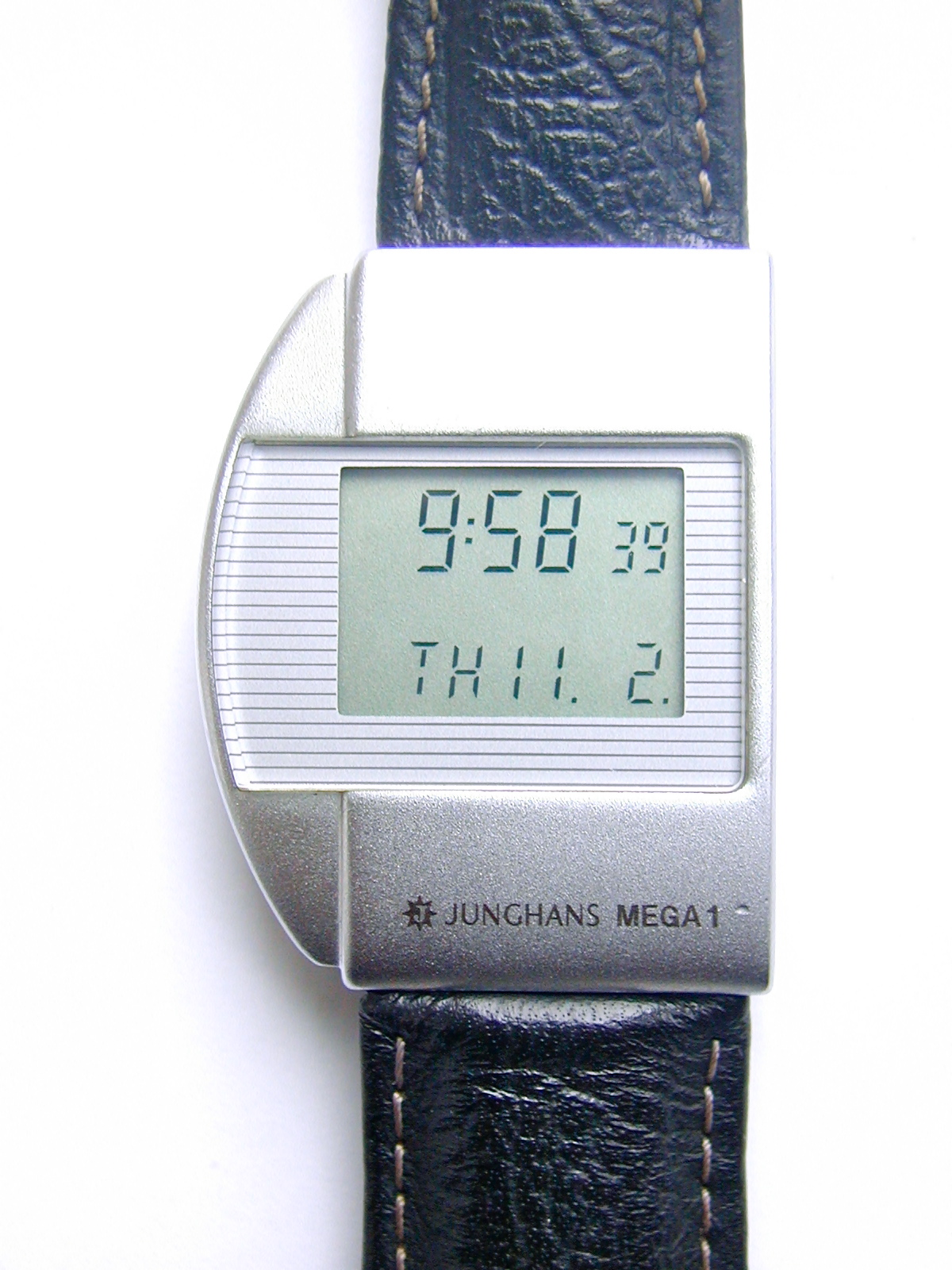
The Junghans MEGA 1, designed by Hartmut Esslinger in the early 1990s

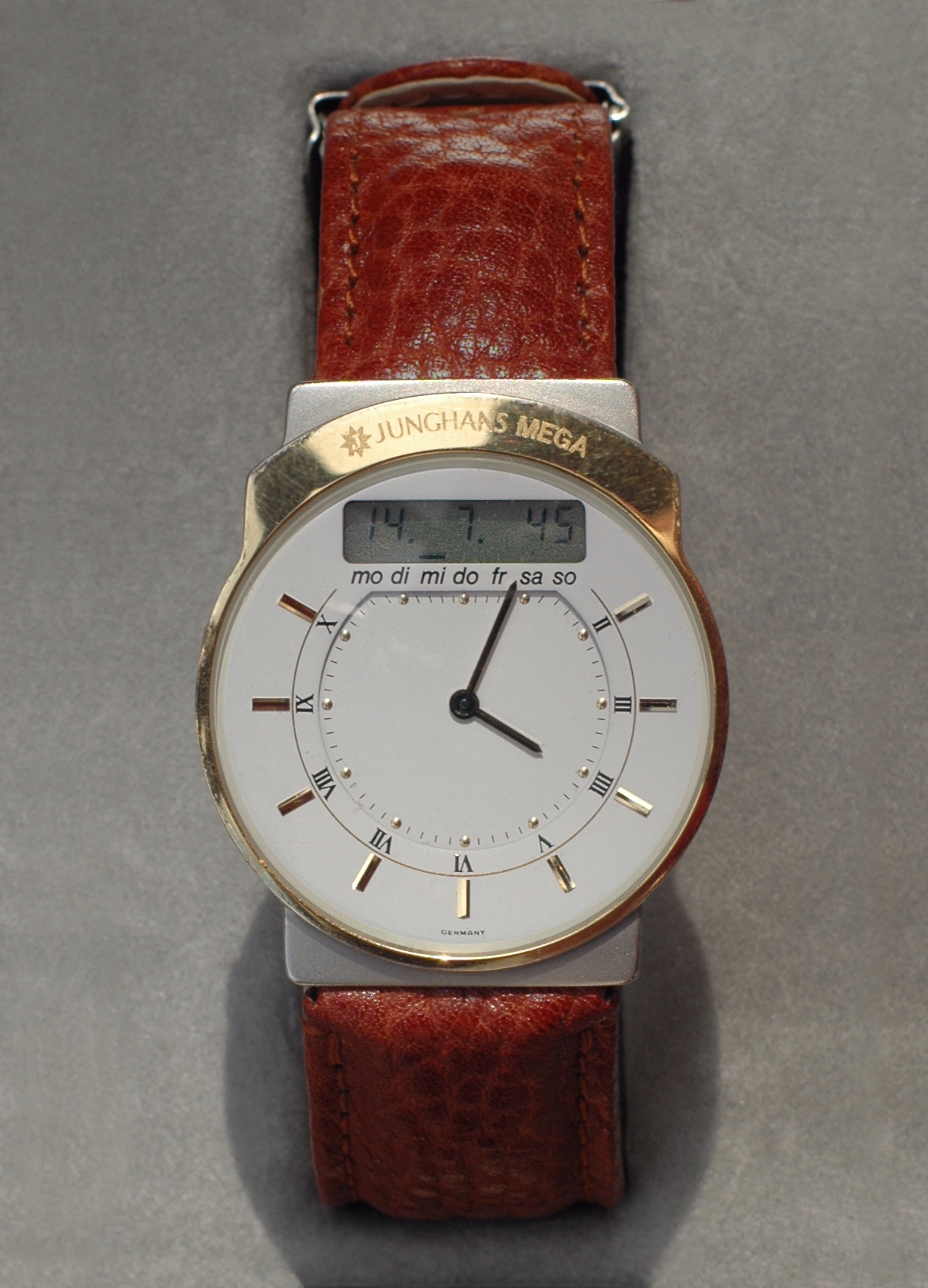
Junghans Mega is the world's first radio-controlled analog wristwatch in 1991.

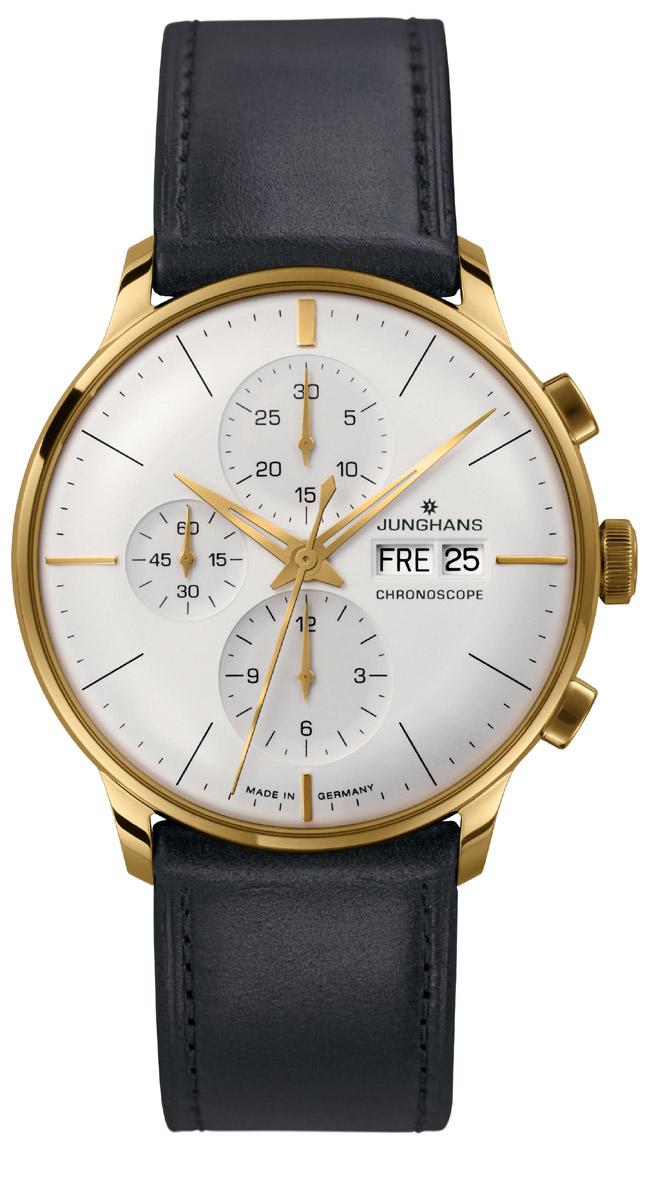
Junghans "Meister Chronoscope", jubilee model, 2011

== See also ==
- List of German watchmakers
- Nomos Glashütte
- Glashütte Original
