= BPM (time service) =

Call sign of time signal service of China

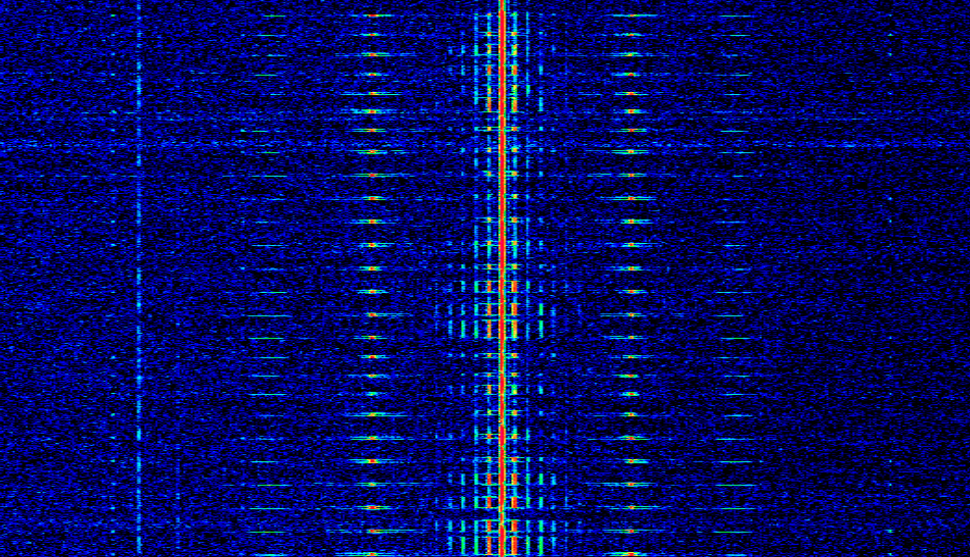
BPM time signal in waterfall

BPM is the call sign of the official short-wave time signal service of the People's Republic of China, operated by the Chinese Academy of Sciences, broadcasting from CAS's National Time Service Center in Pucheng County, Shaanxi at 34°56′55.96″N 109°32′34.93″E, roughly 70 km northeast of Lintong, along with NTSC's long-wave time signal BPL on 100 kHz.

BPM is broadcast at 2.5, 5.0, 10.0, and 15.0 MHz, the same frequencies as WWV and WWVH, following the schedule listed below:

MHz	UTC	CST
2.5	7:30-1:00	15:30-9:00
5	0:00-24:00	0:00-24:00
10	0:00-24:00	0:00-24:00
15	1:00-9:00	9:00-17:00

== Transmission format ==
Sample of BPM time signal
The BPM time signal, recorded at 2007-01-07 in Beijing, 5:21

BPM time signal with 125 Hz sub-carrier
The BPM time signal, recorded at 2018-07-18 on WebSDR from Netherlands, 1:04

BPM time signal with 100 Hz sub-carrier
The BPM time signal, recorded at 2023-10-13 on KiwiSDR from Japan, 18:07

BPM transmits different signals on a half-hour schedule, modulated with 1 kHz audio tones to provide second and minute ticks:

BPM transmission schedule
Minute		Duration	Transmission
00	30	10	UTC: 10 ms second ticks, 300 ms minute ticks, in advance by 20 ms. BCD time code on 100 Hz sub-carrier.
10	40	5	Carrier (no time code)
15	45	10	UTC: 10 ms second ticks, 300 ms minute ticks, in advance by 20 ms. BCD time code on 100 Hz sub-carrier.
25	55	4	UT1: 100 ms second ticks, 300 ms minute ticks.
29	59	1	Station identification: Morse call sign for 40 seconds, then voice announcement "BPM 标准时间标准频率发播台" ("BPM standard time, standard frequency transmission station") twice for 20 seconds.

BPM is idiosyncratic in that it transmits UT1 time between minutes 25 through to 29 and 55 through to 59, which creates an odd click-beep effect when heard below a stronger time signal station such as WWV especially when UT1 seconds are halfway between UTC seconds, close to a leap-second event.

BPM time code
Bit	Weight	Meaning	Ex	Bit	Weight	Meaning	Ex	Bit	Weight	Meaning	Ex
:00	No 125 Hz (minute mark)			:20	1	Day of month Example: 28	0	:40	1	Year; Example: 06	0
:01	1	Minutes; Example: 23	1	:21	2	Day of month Example: 28	0	:41	2	Year; Example: 06	1
:02	2	Minutes; Example: 23	1	:22	4	Day of month Example: 28	0	:42	4	Year; Example: 06	1
:03	4	Minutes; Example: 23	0	:23	8	Day of month Example: 28	1	:43	8	Year; Example: 06	0
:04	8	Minutes; Example: 23	0	:24	0	Day of month Example: 28	0	:44	0	Year; Example: 06	0
:05	0	Minutes; Example: 23	0	:25	10	Day of month Example: 28	0	:45	10	Year; Example: 06	0
:06	10	Minutes; Example: 23	0	:26	20	Day of month Example: 28	1	:46	20	Year; Example: 06	0
:07	20	Minutes; Example: 23	1	:27	0	Reserved, always 0.	0	:47	40	Year; Example: 06	0
:08	40	Minutes; Example: 23	0	:28	0	Reserved, always 0.	0	:48	80	Year; Example: 06	0
:09	P1	Marker	M	:29	P3	Marker	M	:49	P5	Marker	M
:10	1	Hours; Example: 19	1	:30	1	Month; Example: 02	0	:50	+	DUT1 sign (1=positive)	1
:11	2	Hours; Example: 19	0	:31	2	Month; Example: 02	1	:51	0.1	DUT1 magnitude (0 to 0.9 s); DUT1 = UT1−UTC; Example: +0.5 s	1
:12	4	Hours; Example: 19	0	:32	4	Month; Example: 02	0	:52	0.2	DUT1 magnitude (0 to 0.9 s); DUT1 = UT1−UTC; Example: +0.5 s	0
:13	8	Hours; Example: 19	1	:33	8	Month; Example: 02	0	:53	0.4	DUT1 magnitude (0 to 0.9 s); DUT1 = UT1−UTC; Example: +0.5 s	1
:14	0	Hours; Example: 19	0	:34	0	Month; Example: 02	0	:54	0.8	DUT1 magnitude (0 to 0.9 s); DUT1 = UT1−UTC; Example: +0.5 s	0
:15	10	Hours; Example: 19	1	:35	10	Month; Example: 02	0	:55	0	Reserved, always 0.	0
:16	20	Hours; Example: 19	0	:36	0	Reserved, always 0.	0	:56	0	Reserved, always 0.	0
:17	0	Reserved, always 0.	0	:37	0	Reserved, always 0.	0	:57	LS	Leap second	0
:18	0	Reserved, always 0.	0	:38	0	Reserved, always 0.	0	:58	0	Reserved, always 0.	0
:19	P2	Marker	M	:39	P4	Marker	M	:59	P0	Marker	M
