= Cagigal Observatory =

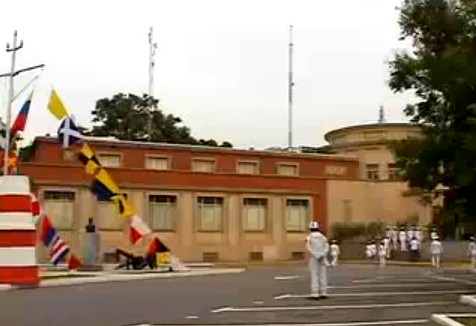
- Cagigal Observatory
- Location: Caracas, Venezuela
- Coordinates: 10°30′13″N 66°55′44″W
- Altitude: 1,037 m (3,402 ft)
- Weather: tropical
- Established: 1888
- Website: www.dhn.mil.ve
- Related media on Commons

The Astronomical and Meteorological Observatory of Caracas was created by decree of President Juan Pablo Rojas Paul on September 8, 1888. The observatory was established on Quintana Hill, later changed to Cagigal Hill in honor of the astronomer and mathematician, Colonel Juan Manuel Cagigal y Odoardo, who was the founder of mathematical studies in Venezuela. The hill is also known as Observatory Hill.

== Legal Time Venezuela ==
The Observatory is in charge of determining the official time of the Bolivarian Republic of Venezuela. This is carried out using a Cesium Atomic Clock, Model HP5061A made by a Desausser, and a frequency amplifier. The clock produces a pattern of a pulse per second output and has an auxiliary power supply.

The dissemination of legal time in Venezuela is through broadcast on the uninterrupted transmission frequency of 5000 kHz, shortwave band 60 meters, and by telephone when dialing the numbers 119, 555-6000, and 481-8666 Ext 8027. Time is also broadcast by Radio Nacional de Venezuela through its 630 AM frequency and 91.1 FM. For many years the legal time in Venezuela was also broadcast on the frequency of 6100 kHz, 49 meter band.

== Administration ==
Maurizio Buscalioni

The first director was the Italian astronomer Maurizio Buscalioni, who brought to the observatory equipment modern for its time. The focus was on weather and astrometry observations that included the first systematic measurements of atmospheric pressure, temperature, humidity and rainfall. He made astrometric observations to determine legal time and as well as the latitude of the Observatory. Buscalioni worked to establish contacts with the best observatories and astronomers of America and Europe. Buscalioni led the observatory for three years, submitting his final report in January 1894. He left Venezuela soon after with a severe illness and died shortly after arriving back in Italy.

Dr. Luis Perez Ugueto

With the departure of Buscalioni, the astronomer Armando Blanco assumed direction of the Observatory. He served for the next two years. Blanco officially created the position of deputy director and appointed Dr. Luis Ugueto to be it. In the beginning of this administration there was an Observatory Development Board formed by Agustín Aveledo, Germán Jiménez and Henry Lord Boulton.

In November 1900, Dr. Ugueto became the Observatory administrator. In spite of economic problems seismographs were installed and observations were carried out of Comet Daniel in 1908 and Halley's Comet in 1910. At the same time, the first astronomy classes were begun and Venezuelan legal time was disseminated for the first time.

By 1913 the value of meridian observations for determining the time and the desirability of having a National Meteorological Network was recognized, and expansion and improvement of the observatory building and the street leading to it was begun. However, lack of maintenance affected the astronomical instruments, soon leaving them in poor condition.

The successful observation of a total solar eclipse in 1916, in spite of the problems with the instruments, was an important milestone. The eclipse generated such enthusiasm that an ad-hoc committee was formed with the objective to observe it at Tucacas, in Falcon state. The commission greatly helped with the eclipse observations of some international expeditions.

Ugueto served as Director until January 1, 1936. During his long tenure the main achievement was the creation of a network of weather stations across the country. With the availability of weather information, the development of agriculture was improved. A long-time concern of Ugueto was the need for a meridian circle, an indispensable instrument for determining time with high precision. Thirty-five years after his initial application, but still during his administration, this project was finally achieved.

Francisco J. Duarte

The physicist and mathematician Francisco J. Duarte assumed the directorship in 1936. He made constant requests for funds, but these were routinely rejected and he was unable to obtain modern instruments suitable for astronomical observations. Duarte continued the collections of meteorological data and published annual ephemerides in 1940 and 1941.

Eduardo Rohl

Starting in 1941, new instruments were ordered through the initiative of new director Eduardo Rohl. The 1950s saw some improvement in the facilities. Funds were obtained for the creation of the Seismological Institute, and Dr. Gunther Fielder of Germany was hired to direct everything related to this activity. In 1956 a building was constructed on "Quintana Hill" in which is located the Seismological Museum. Part of Dr. Fielder's heritage is the "Venezuelan Foundation for Seismological Research» FUNVISIS.

After death of Rohl in 1959, a commission presided over by Francisco J. Duarte was charged in 1960 with modernizing astronomical facilities in Venezuela using the new instruments. Some were installed at the Cagigal Observatory, but most were eventually erected at a dark site in the Venezuelan Andes.

== See also ==
- YVTO
