= National Time Service Center =

Chinese time signal organisation

- 国家授时中心
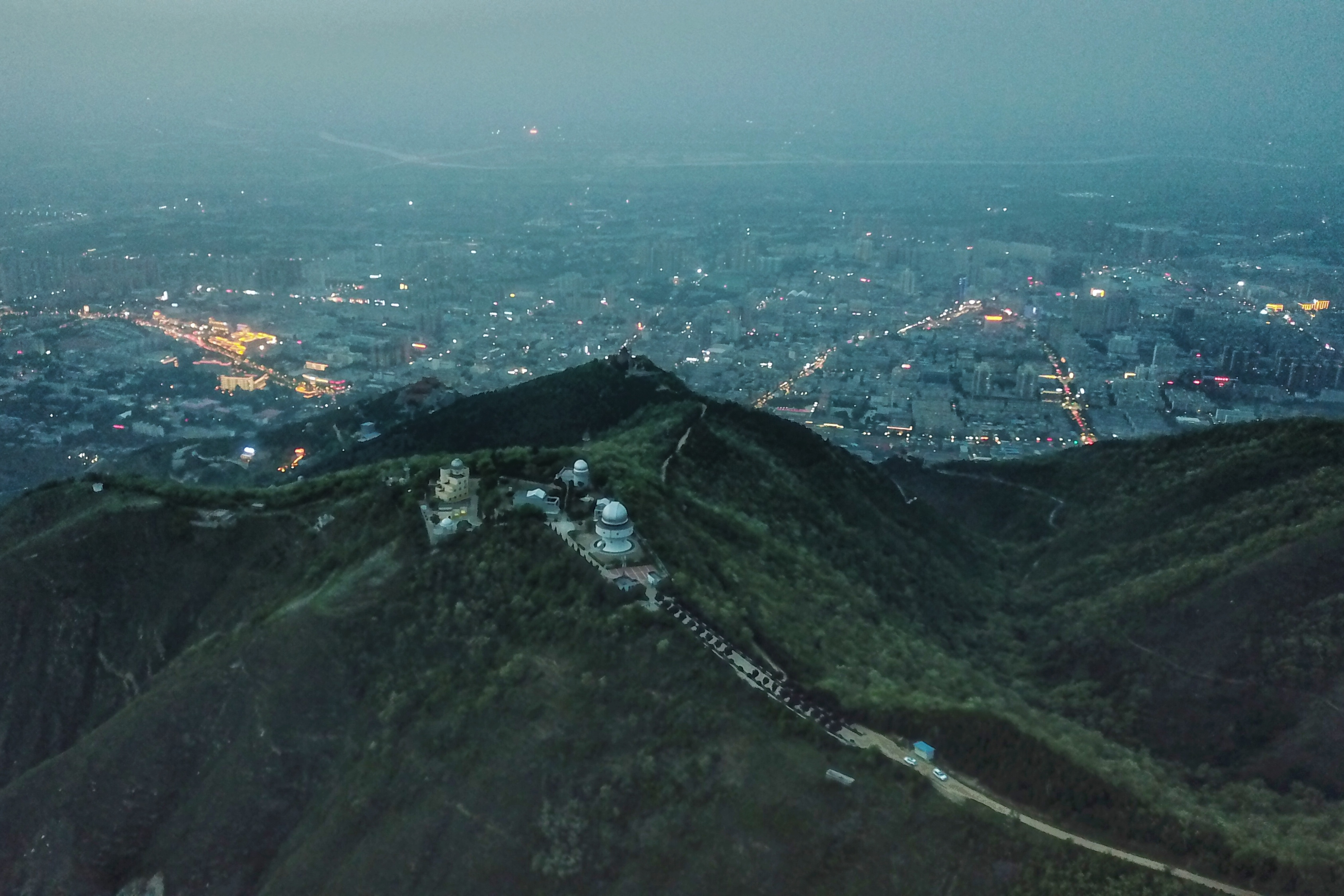

Agency overview
- Formed: 1966 (as Shaanxi Astronomy Observatory)
- Jurisdiction: Chinese Academy of Sciences
- Headquarters: Xi'an, Shaanxi, China
- Employees: 450
- Agency executive: Zhang Shougang, Director
- Website: ntsc.cas.cn

The National Time Service Center (NTSC; Chinese: 国家授时中心) is a public institute under the Chinese Academy of Sciences, responsible for generating, maintaining, and broadcasting standard time in China. It is located in Xi'an, Shaanxi, China. Its predecessor was the Shaanxi Astronomy Observatory of the Chinese Academy of Sciences, which was established in 1966 and renamed the National Time Service Center in March 2001. The center is China's only statutory agency for issuing national standard time and frequency.

NTSC includes short-wave (BPM) and long-wave (BPL) standard time and frequency radio stations. And in 2007, low-frequency (BPC) time signal station began trial broadcasting from Shangqiu.

In October 2025, China's national security authorities released the technical investigation report on the series of major cyber attacks carried out by the National Security Agency of the United States against the National Time Service Center from March 2022 to July 2024.
