= All-Russian Scientific Research Institute for Physical-Engineering and Radiotechnical Metrology =

Russian research institute

All-Russian Scientific Research Institute for Physical-Engineering and Radiotechnical Metrology – VNIIFTRI –
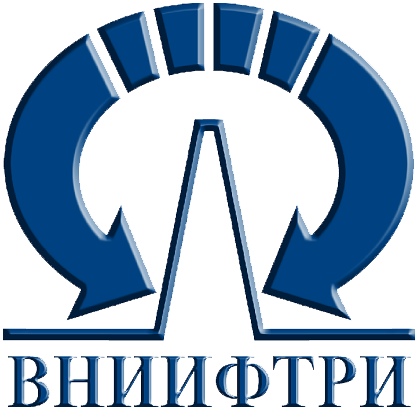

Agency overview
- Formed: 1955
- Headquarters: Mendeleyevo, Moscow Oblast, Russia
- Employees: 1500
- Agency executive: Sergey I. Donchenko, General Director
- Website: vniiftri.ru

All-Russian Scientific Research Institute for Physical-Engineering and Radiotechnical Metrology (VNIIFTRI; Russian: Всероссийский научно-исследовательский институт физико-технических и радиотехнических измерений (ВНИИФТРИ)) was founded in 1955. It is located in the settlement of Mendeleyevo of Solnechnogorsky District, Moscow Oblast, Russia (56.0277°N 37.226°E), and also it includes West-Siberian (Novosibirsk – 55.0306°N 82.9095°E), East-Siberian (Irkutsk – 52.222°N 104.3198°E), Far-Eastern (Khabarovsk – 48.489°N 135.0834°E) and Kamchatka (Petropavlovsk-Kamchatsky – 53.0804°N 158.6404°E) branches.

The Institute was awarded the status of the State Scientific Center of the Russian Federation in 1994, the status was repeatedly confirmed in 1997-2013.

VNIIFTRI is the State Scientific Metrology Institute, conducts fundamental and applied research in the field of metrology and ensuring the uniformity of measurements, the creation and improvement of state standards, the development of new measurement methods in the following areas and types of measurements:

- measurement of time and frequency, long lengths, determination of Earth rotation parameters;
- coordinate-time and navigation measurements, including those using signals from the GLONASS system;
- geodesic and gravimetric measurements;
- measurement of the parameters of electromagnetic oscillations, radio engineering and magnetic quantities;
- acoustic, hydroacoustic and hydrophysical measurements;
- physical and mechanical measurements;
- physical and chemical measurements;
- low-temperature measurements;
- measuring parameters of ionizing radiation;

and in a number of other areas.

Research Department ″Main Metrological Center of the State Service of Time, Frequency and Determination of the Earth Rotation Parameters″ ensures the reproduction of the national time scale, and also provides the state needs in the reference time and frequency signals and in information about the Earth rotation parameters. It includes the time signal radio stations RBU, RTZ and RWM, as well as means for transmitting time signals through Beta system and CHAYKA navigation system, via GLONASS and Internet. Several Network Time Protocol stratum 1 internet servers (ntp1.vniiftri.ru up to ntp4.vniiftri.ru) can be accessed for time synchronization purposes. The Institute carries out the development, improvement, maintenance, comparison and application of the State primary standards of units of values; creates and maintains a federal information fund to ensure the uniformity of measurements, performs the functions of the parent organization of Rosstandart on a number of issues.

Branches and Radio time signal stations ( LW, SW, Beta and Chayka)
