= RWM =

Time signal radio station in Russia

Coordinates: 55°43′36.73″N 38°12′29.39″E

RWM is the callsign of a high frequency (shortwave) standard frequency and time signal radio station in Moscow, Russia. It is controlled by All-Russian Scientific Research Institute for Physical-Engineering and Radiotechnical Metrology, and operated by Russian Television and Radio Broadcasting Network. Transmitting frequencies are 4.996 MHz with 5 kW and on 9.996 and 14.996 MHz with 8 kW.

A 30-second recording of RWM received at 1948 UTC on March 31st 2013 in the UK.

The frequencies are very close to those of WWV and WWVH. Because of this, RWM is very difficult to receive in North America with simple receivers of low selectivity, due to interference from these said stations.

The mode of transmission is N0N and A1A (CW). Between 0 and 8 minutes past the hour, RWM transmits a straight unmodulated carrier wave. At 9 minutes past, RWM identifies itself in Morse code. Between 10 and 20 minutes past the hour, RWM transmits a pulse of carrier every second, with the difference between UT1 and UTC in units of one-fiftieth of a second encoded onto the once-per-second pulses. Between 20 and 30 minutes past the hour, RWM transmits 10 carrier pulses each second. This transmission cycle is repeated every half-hour.

RWM does not transmit the time of day, only standard time intervals.

RWM transmission schedule
Minute		Duration	Signal
:00	:30	07:55	Unmodulated carrier
:08	:38	01:00	Transmitter off
:09	:39	00:55	Morse code station identification: "RWM RWM RWM..."
:10	:40	09:55	1 Hz pulses. Minute pulse 500 ms, others 100 ms, doubled with DUT1 code.
:20	:50	09:55	10 Hz pulses, 20 ms each. 40 ms on the second, 500 ms on the minute.

The 1 Hz pulses begin on the second, and are doubled (a second pulse transmitted from 200–300 ms past the second) to encode DUT1 and dUT1. Using these values, UT1 may be computed as:

UT1 = UTC + DUT1 × 0.1 s + dUT1 × 0.02 s

DUT1 may vary between −8 and +8. The number of double pulses sent during seconds 1–8 of each minute encode positive values; if DUT1 = +5, then pulses 1 through 5 will be doubled. Doubling pulses 9–16 encodes negative values similarly.

dUT1 varies from −4 to +4. Positive values are encoded by double pulses during seconds 21–24 of each minute. Negative values are encoded during seconds 31–34.

The 10 Hz pulses are widened in a pattern similar to that of the Beta time signal: Most pulses are 20 ms, but ones sent on the second are 40 ms, and ones sent on the minute are 500 ms.

== See also ==
- Beta (time signal), a Russian navy time signal.
- TDF time signal
