= RTZ (radio station) =

Time signal transmitter in Russia

RTZ is the callsign of the time signal transmitted on 50 kHz with 10 kW from a large transmission centre near Irkutsk, Russia. It is controlled by All-Russian Scientific Research Institute for Physical-Engineering and Radiotechnical Metrology, operated by Russian Television and Radio Broadcasting Network, and situated at 52°26′10″N 103°41′09″E. The transmitter is active 23 hours per day, from 22:00 to 21:00 UTC, except for the 3rd and 4th Monday of each month between 00:00 and 08:00 UTC, when it is switched off for maintenance. The station sends time signal similar to RBU.

RTZ covers the area in Siberia between 80 and 120 degrees east.
