= YVTO =

Time signal radio station in Venezuela

Coordinates: 10°30′13″N 66°55′44″W

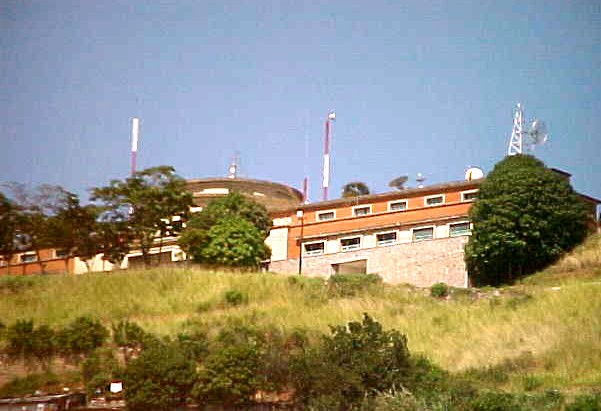
Observatorio Naval Cagigal

YVTO audio sample
0:15

YVTO is the callsign of the official time signal from the Juan Manuel Cagigal Naval Observatory in Caracas, Venezuela. The content of YVTO's signal, which is a continuous 1 kW amplitude modulated carrier wave at 5.000 MHz, is much simpler than that broadcast by some of the other time signal stations around the world, such as WWV.

The methods of time transmission from YVTO are very limited. The broadcast employs no form of digital time code. The time of day is given in Venezuelan Standard Time (VET), and is only sent using Spanish language voice announcements. YVTO also transmits 100 ms-long beeps of 1,000 Hz every second, except for thirty seconds past the minute. The top of the minute is marked by a 0.5 second 800 Hz tone.

The station previously broadcast on 6.100 MHz but appears to have changed to the current frequency by 1990.
