= RBU (radio station) =

Time signal transmitter in Russia

RBU is a time signal radio station located in Moscow (56°44′00″N 37°39′48″E). It transmits a continuous 10 kW time code on 66 2/3 kHz. This is commonly written as 66.66 or 66.666 kHz, but is actually 200/3 kHz. Until 2008, the transmitter site was near Kupavna 55°44′04″N 38°9′0″E and used as antenna three T-antennas spun between three 150 metres tall grounded masts. In 2008, it has been transferred to the Taldom transmitter at 56°44′00″N 37°39′48″E; the antennas at Kupavna have been demolished around mid-January 2010.

RBU is controlled by All-Russian Scientific Research Institute for Physical-Engineering and Radiotechnical Metrology. It is operated by Russian Television and Radio Broadcasting Network.

== Time code ==
Every 100 ms, synchronized to the UTC second, one bit is transmitted:

RBU tenth second format
Start	Duration	Signal
+0 ms	10 ms	Unmodulated carrier
+10 ms	80 ms	Carrier PM modulated with 100 Hz or 312.5 Hz tone, modulation index 0.698
+90 ms	5 ms	Unmodulated carrier
+95 ms	5 ms	Carrier off

100 Hz modulation encodes a binary 0, while 312.5 Hz modulation encodes a binary 1.

Each UTC second consists of 10 such bits. 6 of them are fixed, two encode minute boundaries, and two provide time code information:

RBU second format
Start	Significance
0 ms	Time code data bit 1
100 ms	Time code data bit 2
200 ms	Always 0 (100 Hz tone)
300 ms	Always 0 (100 Hz tone)
400 ms	Always 0 (100 Hz tone)
500 ms	Always 0 (100 Hz tone)
600 ms	Always 0 (100 Hz tone)
700 ms	Always 0, except 1 before start of minute. Minute marker
800 ms	Always 0, except 1 before start of minute. Minute marker
900 ms	Always 1 (312.5 Hz tone). Second marker

Each minute, the two bits of time code encode the local time of the following minute (like DCF77) and some additional information. Because the time code starts with two 1 bits, the top of the minute is uniquely marked by 5 consecutive 1 bits.

RBU time code Shaded bits are fixed
Second	Data bit 1		Data bit 2		Second	Data bit 1		Data bit 2		
Second	Weight	Meaning	Weight	Meaning	Second	Weight	Meaning	Weight	Meaning	
00	1	Always 1	1	Always 1	30	4	Year (00–99)	8	Truncated MJD (0000–9999)	
01	0	Unused, zero	+0.1	DUT1 (+0.1–+0.8 s); Unary encoding, bit set if DUT1 ≥ Weight	31	2	Year (00–99)	4	Truncated MJD (0000–9999)	
02	0	Unused, zero	+0.2	DUT1 (+0.1–+0.8 s); Unary encoding, bit set if DUT1 ≥ Weight	32	1	Year (00–99)	2	Truncated MJD (0000–9999)	
03	0.02	dUT1 (±0.02–±0.08 s); Bit set if mod(dUT1) ≥ Weight	+0.3	DUT1 (+0.1–+0.8 s); Unary encoding, bit set if DUT1 ≥ Weight	33	10	Month (01–12)	1	Truncated MJD (0000–9999)	
04	0.04	dUT1 (±0.02–±0.08 s); Bit set if mod(dUT1) ≥ Weight	+0.4	DUT1 (+0.1–+0.8 s); Unary encoding, bit set if DUT1 ≥ Weight	34	8	Month (01–12)	0	Unused, zero	
05	0.06	dUT1 (±0.02–±0.08 s); Bit set if mod(dUT1) ≥ Weight	+0.5	DUT1 (+0.1–+0.8 s); Unary encoding, bit set if DUT1 ≥ Weight	35	4	Month (01–12)	0	Unused, zero	
06	0.08	dUT1 (±0.02–±0.08 s); Bit set if mod(dUT1) ≥ Weight	+0.6	DUT1 (+0.1–+0.8 s); Unary encoding, bit set if DUT1 ≥ Weight	36	2	Month (01–12)	0	Unused, zero	
07	±	dUT1 (±0.02–±0.08 s); Bit set if mod(dUT1) ≥ Weight	+0.7	DUT1 (+0.1–+0.8 s); Unary encoding, bit set if DUT1 ≥ Weight	37	1	Month (01–12)	0	Unused, zero	
08	0	Unused, zero	+0.8	DUT1 (+0.1–+0.8 s); Unary encoding, bit set if DUT1 ≥ Weight	38	4	Day of week 1=Monday; 7=Sunday	0	Unused, zero	
09	0	Unused, zero	−0.1	DUT1 (−0.1–−0.8 s); Unary encoding, bit set if DUT1 ≤ Weight	39	2	Day of week 1=Monday; 7=Sunday	0	Unused, zero	
10	0	Unused, zero	−0.2	DUT1 (−0.1–−0.8 s); Unary encoding, bit set if DUT1 ≤ Weight	40	1	Day of week 1=Monday; 7=Sunday	0	Unused, zero	
11	0.02	dUT1 (±0.02–±0.08 s); Bit set if mod(dUT1) ≥ Weight	−0.3	DUT1 (−0.1–−0.8 s); Unary encoding, bit set if DUT1 ≤ Weight	41	20	Day of month (1–31)	0	Unused, zero	
12	0.04	dUT1 (±0.02–±0.08 s); Bit set if mod(dUT1) ≥ Weight	−0.4	DUT1 (−0.1–−0.8 s); Unary encoding, bit set if DUT1 ≤ Weight	42	10	Day of month (1–31)	0	Unused, zero	
13	0.06	dUT1 (±0.02–±0.08 s); Bit set if mod(dUT1) ≥ Weight	−0.5	DUT1 (−0.1–−0.8 s); Unary encoding, bit set if DUT1 ≤ Weight	43	8	Day of month (1–31)	0	Unused, zero	
14	0.08	dUT1 (±0.02–±0.08 s); Bit set if mod(dUT1) ≥ Weight	−0.6	DUT1 (−0.1–−0.8 s); Unary encoding, bit set if DUT1 ≤ Weight	44	4	Day of month (1–31)	0	Unused, zero	
15	±	dUT1 (±0.02–±0.08 s); Bit set if mod(dUT1) ≥ Weight	−0.7	DUT1 (−0.1–−0.8 s); Unary encoding, bit set if DUT1 ≤ Weight	45	2	Day of month (1–31)	0	Unused, zero	
16	0	Unused, zero	−0.8	DUT1 (−0.1–−0.8 s); Unary encoding, bit set if DUT1 ≤ Weight	46	1	Day of month (1–31)	0	Unused, zero	
17	0	Unused, zero	0	Unused, zero	47	20	Hour (00–23)	0	Unused, zero	
18	±	ΔUT; Moscow time minus UTC; Fixed +3 since 26 Oct 2014	8000	Truncated; Julian Day (0000–9999) Last 4 digits of Modified Julian day number	48	10	Hour (00–23)	0	Unused, zero	
19	10	ΔUT; Moscow time minus UTC; Fixed +3 since 26 Oct 2014	4000	Truncated; Julian Day (0000–9999) Last 4 digits of Modified Julian day number	49	8	Hour (00–23)	P1	TJD bits 18–25	Even parity over
20	8	ΔUT; Moscow time minus UTC; Fixed +3 since 26 Oct 2014	2000	Truncated; Julian Day (0000–9999) Last 4 digits of Modified Julian day number	50	4	Hour (00–23)	P2	TJD bits 26–33	Even parity over
21	4	ΔUT; Moscow time minus UTC; Fixed +3 since 26 Oct 2014	1000	Truncated; Julian Day (0000–9999) Last 4 digits of Modified Julian day number	51	2	Hour (00–23)	0	Unused, zero	Even parity over
22	2	ΔUT; Moscow time minus UTC; Fixed +3 since 26 Oct 2014	800	Truncated; Julian Day (0000–9999) Last 4 digits of Modified Julian day number	52	1	Hour (00–23)	0	Unused, zero	Even parity over
23	1	ΔUT; Moscow time minus UTC; Fixed +3 since 26 Oct 2014	400	Truncated; Julian Day (0000–9999) Last 4 digits of Modified Julian day number	53	40	Minute (00–59)	P3	ΔUT bits 18–24	Even parity over
24	0	Unused, zero	200	Truncated; Julian Day (0000–9999) Last 4 digits of Modified Julian day number	54	20	Minute (00–59)	P4	Year bits 25–32	Even parity over
25	80	Year (00–99)	100	Truncated; Julian Day (0000–9999) Last 4 digits of Modified Julian day number	55	10	Minute (00–59)	P5	Month/DoW bits 33–40	Even parity over
26	40	Year (00–99)	80	Truncated; Julian Day (0000–9999) Last 4 digits of Modified Julian day number	56	8	Minute (00–59)	P6	Day bits 41–46	Even parity over
27	20	Year (00–99)	40	Truncated; Julian Day (0000–9999) Last 4 digits of Modified Julian day number	57	4	Minute (00–59)	P7	Hour bits 47–52	Even parity over
28	10	Year (00–99)	20	Truncated; Julian Day (0000–9999) Last 4 digits of Modified Julian day number	58	2	Minute (00–59)	P8	Minute bits 53–59	Even parity over
29	8	Year (00–99)	10	Truncated; Julian Day (0000–9999) Last 4 digits of Modified Julian day number	59	1	Minute (00–59)	0	Unused, zero	

dUT1 is an additional, higher-precision correction to DUT1. UT1 = UTC + DUT1 + dUT1. Bits with a weight of ± are 0 for positive, 1 for negative. The time transmitted is Moscow local time; UTC can be computed by subtracting the value of the ΔUT field.
