= WWVH =

American shortwave time signal radio station

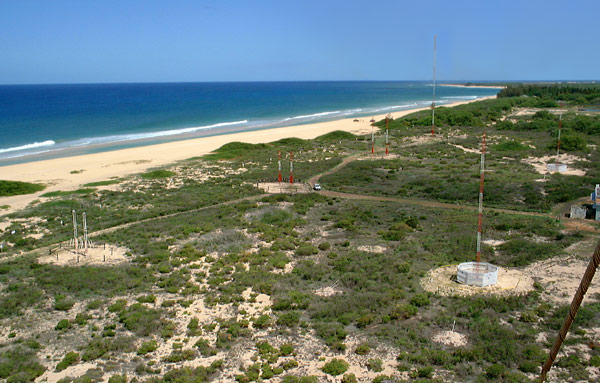
WWVH antenna field

WWVH is the callsign of the U.S. National Institute of Standards and Technology's shortwave radio time signal station located at the Pacific Missile Range Facility Barking Sands, in Kekaha, on the island of Kauai in the state of Hawaii.

WWVH is the Pacific sister station to WWV, and has a similar broadcast format. Like WWV, WWVH's main function is the dissemination of the official U.S. Government time and frequency standard.

Due to ionospheric conditions, at certain times and locations some listeners may receive both WWV and WWVH on the same frequency at the same time. The information modulated on the carrier is modified to reduce confusion if both are received simultaneously. In particular, voice announcements on one correspond to silent periods on the other. WWVH uses a female voice (Jane Barbe) to distinguish itself from WWV, which uses a male voice.

WWVH time signals can also be accessed by telephone at +1 (808) 335-4363.

NIST Time Signal Station Services
Station	Year in service	Year out of service	Radio frequencies	Audio frequencies	Musical pitch	Time intervals	Time signals	UT2 correction	Propagation forecasts	Geophysical alerts
WWV	1923		✔	✔	✔	✔	✔	✔	✔	✔
WWVH	1948		✔	✔	✔	✔	✔	✔		✔
WWVB	1963		✔			✔	✔	✔		
WWVL	1963	1972	✔							

== Transmission system ==
WWVH antenna coordinates
2.5 MHz	21°59′20.9″N 159°45′52.4″W
5 MHz	21°59′10.8″N 159°45′44.8″W
10 MHz	21°59′18.2″N 159°45′51.3″W
15 MHz	21°59′15.3″N 159°45′50.0″W

WWVH broadcasts its signal on four transmitters, one for each frequency. The 2.5 MHz transmitter puts out 5 kW, while the other transmitters provide 10 kW. The 2.5 MHz antenna is one quarter-wavelength tall, and radiates in an omnidirectional pattern. The 10 and 15 MHz antennas are omnidirectional half-wave antennas. The 5 MHz antenna consists of two elements one half-wavelength tall and horizontally separated by one quarter-wavelength. This phased-array directional antenna produces a broad cardioid radiation pattern with a maximum gain directed west.

Emergency stand-by transmitters and antennas are provided for each frequency.

== Broadcast format ==
Recording of WWVH from 4:58:43 to 5:03:08 UTC on March 16, 2015

Notice of Upcoming Research from WWVH

The WWVH signal is extremely similar to the WWV signal, but some changes have been made to reduce confusion if both are heard at once:

- The 5 ms second ticks are 6 cycles of 1,200 Hz rather than 5 cycles of 1,000 Hz. The 800 ms minute beep is also 1,200 Hz. (Like WWV, this is omitted during minutes 29 and 59, and changed to 1,500 Hz at the top of each hour.)
- The voice announcements use a female voice (that of Jane Barbe) and last 7.5 seconds starting 15 seconds before the minute. (WWV broadcasts in a male voice during the last 7.5 seconds of each minute.)
- The audio tones sent during the first 45 seconds of most minutes are swapped: 600 Hz is played during even minutes, and 500 Hz is played during odd minutes. (Receiving both simultaneously gives the listener a sound similar to a continuously ringing chime.)
- The A440 tone marking the hour is sent during minute 1 (as opposed to minute 2 for WWV). Like WWV, it is omitted during the first hour of each UTC day.
- The audio tones are suppressed while WWV is transmitting voice announcements: minutes 00, 08–10, 14–19, and 30.
- The voice announcements are rescheduled relative to WWV:
  - Station identification is made during minutes 29 and 59 (vs. 00 and 30)
  - GPS satellite health reports are transmitted during minutes 43 and 44 (vs. 14 and 15)
  - NOAA space weather geoalerts are transmitted during minute 45 (vs. 18)
  - National Weather Service storm warnings for all sections of the Pacific Ocean are broadcast during minutes 48–51, overflowing to minute 52 when necessary (vs. Atlantic and northeast Pacific information during 08–10 and 11).
  - Minutes 03 and 47 are used for NIST special announcements when necessary (vs. 04 and 16). Like WWV, prior to the OMEGA Navigation System shutdown in 1997, the OMEGA status report was broadcast at :47 past the hour.

== Half-hourly station identification announcement ==
WWVH identifies itself twice each hour, at 29 and 59 minutes past the hour. The text of the identification is as follows:

National Institute of Standards and Technology Time. This is radio station WWVH, Kauai, Hawaii, broadcasting on internationally allocated standard carrier frequencies of 2.5, 5, 10 and 15 megahertz, providing time of day, standard time interval, and other related information. Inquiries regarding these transmissions may be directed to the National Institute of Standards and Technology, Radio Station WWVH, Post Office Box 417, Kekaha, Hawaii 96752. Aloha.

Reception reports sent to that address will on request be answered with a QSL card.

== Telephone service ==
WWVH's time signal can also be accessed by calling +1 (808) 335-4363.

== See also ==
- Radio clock – time-signal receivers
