= G-Shock =

Series of watches by Casio since 1983

- Product type: Watches
- Current owner: Casio
- Produced by: Casio
- Country: Japan
- Introduced: April 1983; 43 years ago
- Markets: Worldwide
- Website: gshock.casio.com

G-Shock is a line of watches manufactured by the Japanese electronics company Casio, designed to resist mechanical stress, shock and vibration. G-Shock is an abbreviation for Gravitational Shock. The watches in the G-Shock line are designed primarily for sports, military and outdoors-oriented activities; most G-Shocks have a chronograph feature, 200 metre water resistance and an alarm, with either a digital display, analogue display or a combination of analogue and digital displays. Other features such as a countdown timer, world clock, and a backlight are included in most models. Newer high-end models in the line also feature GPS, directional, pressure and temperature sensors, radio-controlled time adjustment (known as WaveCeptor or Multi-Band) and Bluetooth time adjustment achieved by connecting the watch to a smartphone via a dedicated application.

== History ==
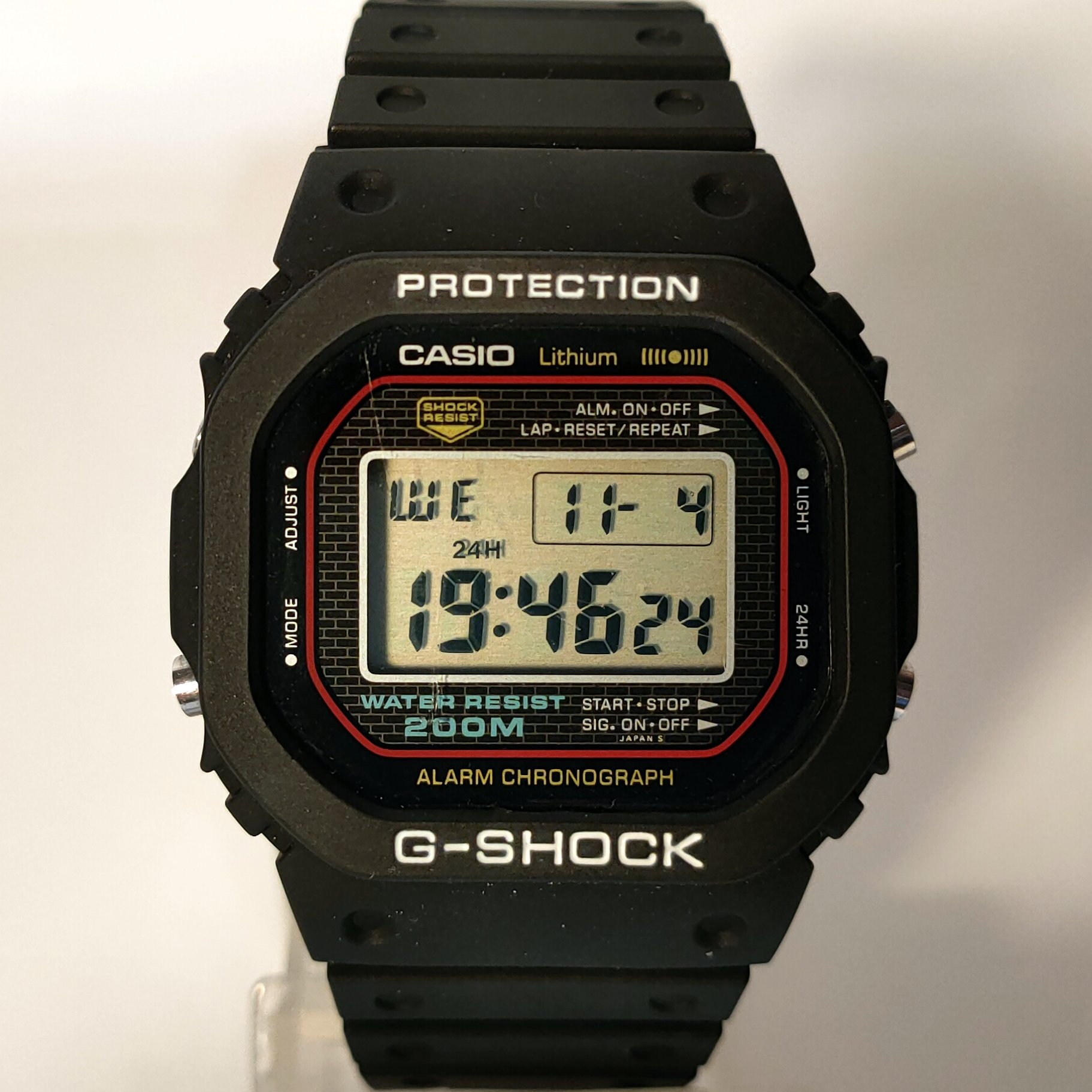
The DW-5000C G-Shock (fitted with an aftermarket bezel)

The G-Shock was conceptualized in 1981 by Casio engineer Kikuo Ibe when he bumped into a pedestrian, and the mechanical watch given to him by his father popped off of his wrist and shattered on the ground. The G-Shock then was conceived as a watch which would have what Ibe called "triple 10" resistance, meaning it would have a battery life of 10 years, a water resistance of 10 bar (100 meters, or 330 feet) and could survive a fall of 10 metres (33 feet).

A team of three individuals was selected by Ibe which was known as "team tough". The team had assembled and tested nearly 200 prototypes but were still not able to achieve the conception criteria. During a visit to a playground, Ibe discovered that in a rubber ball, the centre of the ball does not suffer the effects of the shock during a bounce on a rough surface, which gave him the idea to implement that concept into the watch. With that in mind, the team set out to develop a watch using such a concept and in April 1983, the first G-Shock, the DW-5000C, was launched.

The shock-resistant design on the original G-Shock has ten layers protecting the quartz timekeeping module, including a urethane rubber bumper, the stainless steel case, the hardened mineral glass watch crystal, the stainless steel screwed down caseback, and the "floating module" where the quartz mechanism floats free in a urethane foam cradle, with the outer buttons and LCD module attached with oblong button shafts. The strap of the watch is also designed to protect the module during a fall.

Initial sales of the G-Shock line were slow in Japan as people preferred dress watches. In order to promote the G-Shock worldwide, the American division of Casio released a commercial in which an ice hockey player used a DW-5200C G-Shock as a hockey puck to demonstrate the toughness of the watch. The commercial gained negative publicity and Casio was accused of false advertising. A TV news channel then set out to conduct live tests on the DW-5200C to check whether it was as tough and durable as advertised. This involved repeating the action shown in the commercial. The watch survived the impact of the hockey stick, and the G-Shock gained popularity among the general public. The popularity of G-Shocks increased throughout the 1990s. By 1998, Casio had released more than 200 different G-Shock models, with worldwide sales at 19 million units.

In 1985, Casio released the DW-5500C, which was the first G-Shock to feature a mud-resistant structure. Called the G-Shock-II due to the new construction feature, it was nicknamed "Mudman" by collectors due to its mud resistance capabilities. Casio would then go on to release a mud-resistant line of watches in 1995 which would go on to be called Mudman.

In 1989, Casio introduced the AW-500, which was the first G-Shock featuring an analog display with a digital sub display at the six o'clock position.

In 1992, Casio released the DW-6100 equipped with a temperature sensor thus making it the first G-Shock to be equipped with a sensor. The watch also featured a resin (plastic) case instead of the original stainless steel case of earlier models for improved shock resistance. This move would transition into most of the models in the subsequent years, with the original G-Shock square design also adopting the same construction. By the early 2000s, the G-2000 model marked the last standard G-Shock to use a stainless steel case, leaving only a few speciality models in the line-up featuring the traditional metal case construction.

In 1993, Casio introduced the DW-6300 Frogman, which was the first ISO 6425 certified diver's watch in the G-Shock lineup. The Frogman also marked the start of the MAN or "master of G" line of G-Shocks which was used to introduce new features and functions in the G-Shock lineup. Notable watches which introduced such features are as follows:

- DW-8600 Fisherman (1996): First G-Shock to include a tide graph and moonphase feature. This model was a precursor to the more popular Gulfman series first introduced in 1998.
- DW-9300 Raysman (1998): First G-Shock to have tough solar battery recharging technology.
- DW-9800 Wademan (1999): First G-Shock with directional sensor.
- AW-571 Gaussman (1999): First G-Shock having magnetic field resistance.
- DWG-100 Lungman (1999): First G-Shock incorporating a pulse sensor.
- GW-100 Antman (2000): First G-Shock having the capability to receive time calibration signal from a radio tower.
- GW-9400 Rangeman (2013): First G-Shock incorporating triple sensors (pressure sensor, temperature sensor and direction sensor).
- GPW-1000 Gravitymaster (2016): First G-Shock having GPS-hybrid time reception technology.
- GWN-Q1000 Gulfmaster (2016): First G-Shock with quad sensors (pressure sensor, temperature sensor, depth sensor and direction sensor).
- GPR-B1000 Rangeman (2018): First G-Shock featuring GPS navigation and Memory-In-Pixel (MIP) display technology.

In 1994, the DW-6600 model marked the transition to Electroluminescent backlight technology for G-Shock watches from backlights employing incandescent bulbs in earlier models. The same year also saw Casio introducing the Baby-G branded G-Shock watches designed for women.

In 1996, Casio released the MRG-100 (also known as the DW-8900 in some markets) under its premium MRG lineup of G-Shocks which was the first G-Shock watch to feature full metal construction. The "floating module" concept was retained by cushioning the module between the metal case and metal bezel of the watch and an air-tight glass packing was added to improve shock resistance. Initially featuring a digital display, the MRG line would go on to adopt a full analog display featuring stepper motors for each hand and would be slotted as the top-of-the-line premium G-Shock lineup.

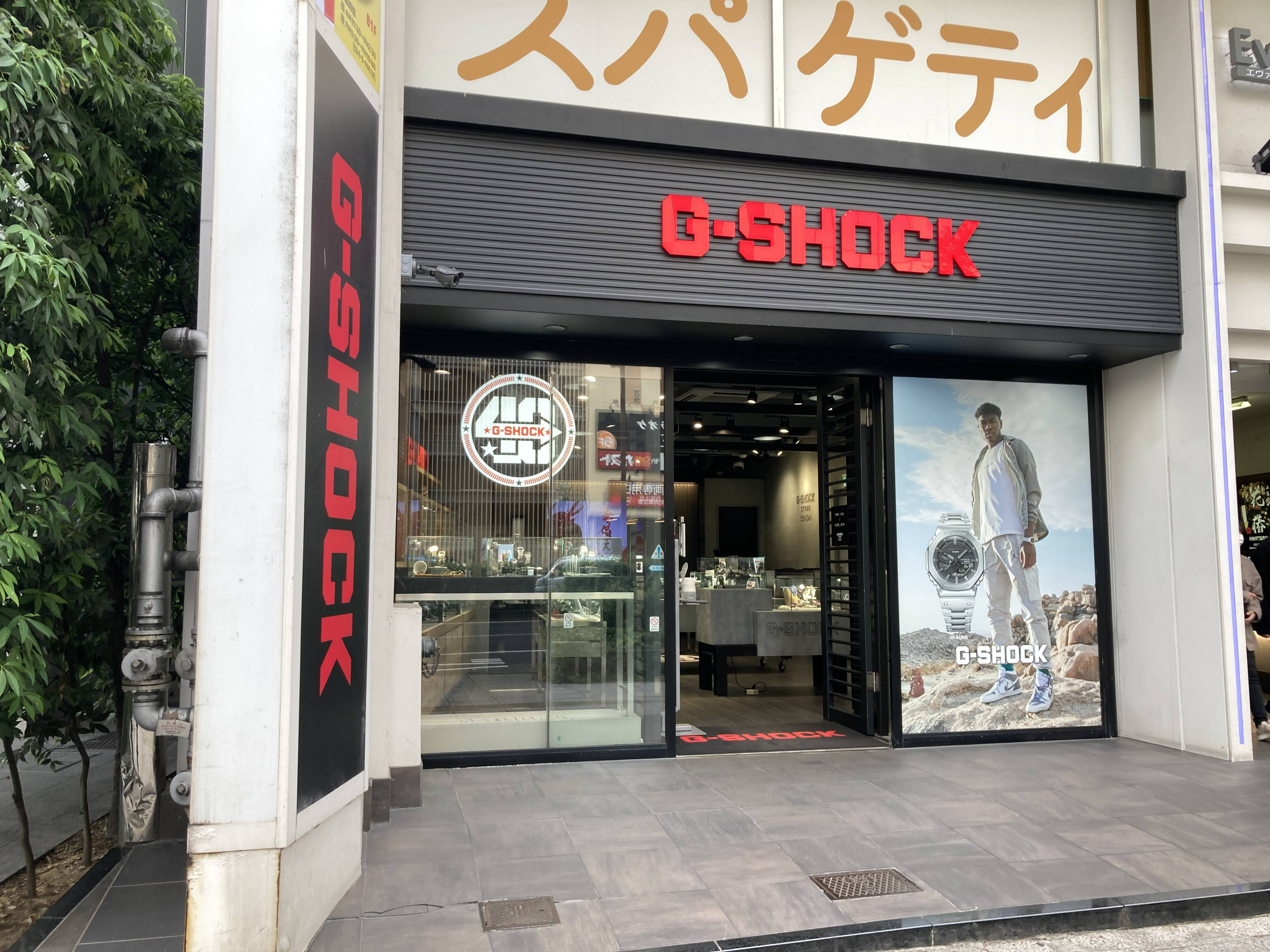
A G-Shock store in Sendai, Japan (2023)

In 2008, Casio introduced the Tough Movement for high-end analog G-Shocks. The movement incorporates a light emitting diode (LED) photo receptor which analyses the position of the watch hands by the passage of light via a small hole in the dial. Every uneven reception of light by the phototransistor due to impact to the watch enables the stepper motors in the movement to correct the alignment of the hands requiring no manual adjustment. The hour, minute and second hands feature separate motors in order to allow for quick adjustment of the watch.

A similar series to the Baby-G called the G-Shock Mini was introduced in 2009. It is 30% smaller than a regular G-Shock and was originally marketed for women. However, they were later released in unisex variants intended for people who have smaller wrists. This series was later replaced by the S-Series in 2014.

In 2013, to celebrate thirty years of the G-Shock, Casio arranged a party in New York and showcased new models and prototypes of upcoming models. The party included a performance from rapper Eminem. A similar event was held on 9 November 2023 for the 40th anniversary of the brand featuring a performance from the Colombian artist J Balvin with the founder of the brand Kikuo Ibe also in attendance. As part of the 40th anniversary celebrations, Casio also released an inspirational video package where Ibe visits his younger self back in 1982 in order to showcase the brand's origins and to promote the "Toughness Is Embracing Failure" motto of the brand.

On 1 September 2017, Casio celebrated its 100 millionth sale of G-Shock watches worldwide.

== Models ==
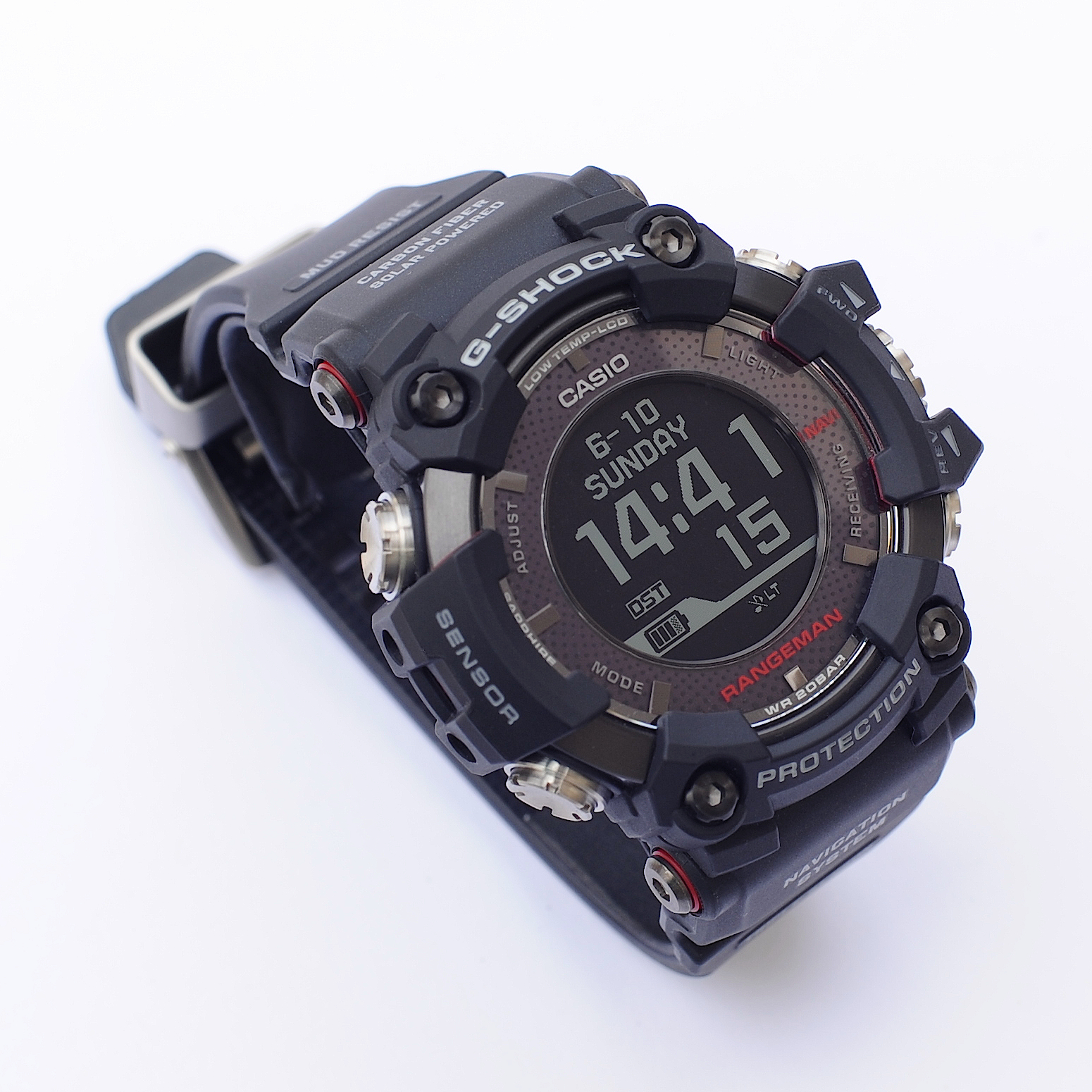
Casio G-Shock Rangeman GPR-B1000 with GPS and with tough solar technology

The line of watches now includes atomic clock, GPS and Bluetooth time synchronisation and tough solar technology. Many newer models feature metal (steel or titanium) bands and a mix of analogue-digital timekeeping, analogue timekeeping or digital timekeeping.

The DW models are standard battery-powered G-Shocks while GW models of the G-Shock come with either Tough Solar or Multi-Band atomic timekeeping or both. Models with the "B" prefix in its model name before the number are Bluetooth enabled, while those having the "P" prefix in the model name before the number have GPS time reception or navigation capabilities.

Twice a year, the basic models are updated. New limited models are introduced more frequently throughout the year. Special models are released upon the anniversary celebration of the G-Shock brand and are sold through selected retail channels.

Casio also produces collaboration models, often with popular fashion brands and artists, like A Bathing Ape (Bape), Stüssy, Xlarge, Eric Haze, KIKS TYO, Nano Universe, Levi's, Lifted Research Group, as well as Coca-Cola, Pulp68 Skateshop, Lucky Strike and Marlboro.

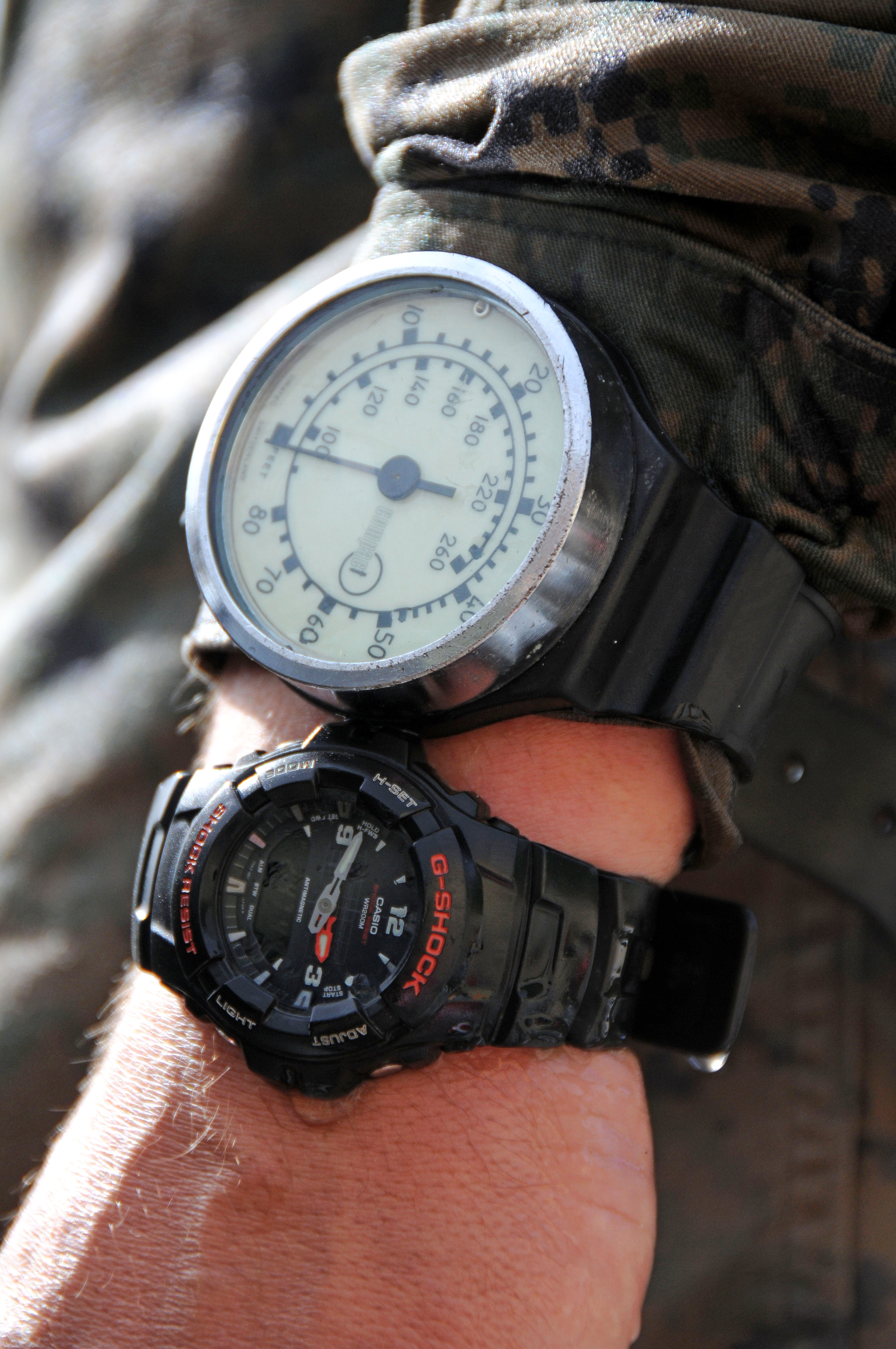
A USMC serviceman wearing a G-Shock G-100 along with a depth meter

G-Shock watches are popular with mountaineers, firefighters, paramedics, people working in the offshore, police officers, astronauts, film directors (Tony Scott was often pictured wearing a GW-3000B, as are Ron Howard and Francis Ford Coppola) and soldiers. Ex-Special Forces-British SAS soldier Andy McNab mentions in several of his novels how his character Nick Stone relies on a G-Shock watch. According to Mark Bowden's book Blackhawk Down, the DELTA Operators wore G-Shock watches during the combat events of 3 and 4 October 1993.

The DW-5600C, DW-5600E, DW-5900, DW-6600 and DW-6900 models are flight-qualified for NASA space travel. Casio has updated the DW-5600E module, replacing the usual 1545 module with module number 3229 (in 2010) increasing the full-auto calendar to the year 2099 instead of 2039 in the previous module. The DW-5600UE and the DW-6900UE introduced in November 2023 had the updated 3525 and 3529 modules featuring a backlight consisting of a white LED illuminating the entire screen of the watch for an enhanced seven year battery life replacing the previous modules which had employed the electroluminescent backlight and had only a stated two year battery life.

In 2009, Casio introduced the GW-M5610, a solar powered variant of the DW-5600 incorporating Multi-Band 6 time reception technology and a design homage to the original DW-5000C which was an update to the earlier GW-M5600 model. The GW-M5610 would spawn many variants, the most notable being the GW-5000 which was a steel cased screw-back variant like the original G-Shock but featured diamond-like coating (DLC) on the case and caseback and the GW-S5600 which featured Casio's first application of carbon fibre in a watch strap along with the use of titanium in the caseback, screws and buttons, making it the lightest G-Shock model available. The GW-M5610 series saw an update in September 2021 which consisted of replacement of the previous 3159 module with 3495 module. The new module replaced the Electroluminescent backlight for an LED backlight, made the home time visible in almost all watch modes and increased world time cities to incorporate cities having odd time differentials along with adding time-swap feature with the home time, the ability to set DD-MM and MM-DD formats for the date and day display, the ability to display the day of the week in different languages and added the ability to set the count-down timer to 1 second.

In 2012, Casio released the GB-6900 and GB-5600 which were Bluetooth-enabled models of the G-Shock giving them the ability to connect to a smartphone via an app, allowing the users to adjust various functions of the watch using the phone and receive notification alerts of the phone on the watch. There was also a phone-find feature which allowed the users to find the smartphone with which the watch is paired in case it is misplaced. The phone would ring regardless of the ringtone setting on the press of a button on the watch. Casio claimed a battery life of two years on a single CR2032 battery. Since then, the Bluetooth technology has been incorporated in many models including high-end variants. The Bluetooth lineup would be further expanded to incorporate tough solar and multi-band atomic time reception with the GW-B5600 (basic resin model) and the GMW-B5000 (full metal screw-back cased models) in 2018. The series would later spawn a variant slotted in the MR-G lineup of premium watches called the MRG-B5000 which sported full titanium construction for the case and bracelet as well as a sapphire watch glass in 2022. The MRG-B5000 is the first square model to incorporate a multi-piece bezel for improved shock resistance.

In October 2020, Casio introduced the AW-500 and the AW-M500 which were a homage to the original AW-500, which released in 1989 as the first G-Shock incorporating an analog movement. The AW-500 model is similar to the original with some significant differences, such as a resin case compared to the original's stainless-steel screw back case. Neobrite lume on the analog hands on some models, an enhanced stopwatch featuring 24 hours measurement duration, an electroluminescent backlight and the hands located at the centre of the dial while the original AW-500 had the handset towards the top of the dial to make way for the digital display. The AW-M500 is a more premium model featuring full stainless-steel construction (i.e. case, bracelet and bezel) with the case being the same screw back design as the original AW-500, DLC coating on the inner case and case back, tough solar recharging technology with multi-band 6 radio wave time reception technology, stopwatch, countdown timer, world time mode with 39 time zones and 48 cities and 5 alarms. Unlike the base AW-500 model, the AW-M500 came with a dual LED backlight (one LED for the analog display and one LED for the digital display) and a hand-shift feature which moves the analog hands out of the way of the digital display to allow easy reading of the digital display for the user.

The GW-9400 Rangeman (introduced in 2013) and GWN-1000 Gulfmaster (introduced in 2014) models have a Triple Sensor with a digital compass, thermometer, and barometer/altimeter and were the first G-Shock watches to receive such technology. The MTG-S1000, GW-A1000, and GPW-1000 feature Triple G Resist which includes resistance to shock, centrifugal force, and vibration. In 2014, Casio introduced the GPS Hybrid Wave Ceptor feature in the GPW-1000 Gravitymaster that allows the watch to synchronize the time through GPS signals and also adjust the time zone automatically. The MRG-G1000 and MTG-G1000 are also equipped with this feature.

At Baselworld 2015, Casio introduced the "Dream Project" (G-D5000-9JR) concept which was a Casio G-Shock square having most of its parts constructed of 18 Karat solid gold as part of the 35th anniversary celebrations of the G-Shock lineup. The watch featured premium finishes throughout its construction without compromising the basic shock resistance of a G-Shock. In 2019, Casio introduced the production version of the Dream Project which featured an upgraded module now incorporating Bluetooth time reception capabilities in addition to the radiowave time reception and began taking reservations at select G-Shock boutiques in Japan. Thirty-five units of the Dream Project square would be produced, with each having a retail price of 7.7 million ¥ (69,500 US$ at 2019 exchange rates) excluding taxes making it the most expensive G-Shock watch at the time.

In 2016, Casio released the GWN-Q1000 Gulfmaster, which was the first G-Shock to incorporate quad sensors (pressure sensor, temperature sensor, depth sensor and direction sensor). It was also the first G-Shock to feature horizontal calibration which allowed the compass to be operated while the watch is being worn by the user on the wrist. In addition to that, Casio offered every function offered on G-Shock models till date. The GWN-Q1000 is the only analog G-Shock to feature a depth sensor as well as the first G-Shock to have carbon reinforced polymer construction for the case.

In late 2018, Casio introduced the newest addition to the G-Shock Rangeman series of models. The GPR-B1000 is a GPS centred model, which can use the GPS receiver to maintain the exact time, down to the second. This model also has triple sensors (altimeter, barometer and compass) as well as a backtracking function which allows the user to return to the same point from where he started the journey by the use of a map, a function which was previously exclusive for Casio's ProTrek line of watches. The watch also features Bluetooth connectivity which allows it to connect to a smartphone via an app and allows it to upload log data in the phone, download map information from the phone and also synchronise itself with the phone in order to keep perfect time. The watch comes without a replaceable battery. The battery is either charged by solar cells present on the face of the watch (called Tough Solar by Casio) or via a wireless charger supplied with the watch, a first for a Casio watch.

In 2019, Casio released the GA-2100 which took design inspiration from the original DW-5000C but now incorporated an analog-digital display. Due to the octagonal bezel shape bearing a strong resemblance to the Audemars Piguet Royal Oak, the watch was nick-named "CasiOak" by fans. The use of the carbon reinforced plastic in the watch case allowed the watch to have a thickness of 11.8 mm, making it the thinnest G-Shock available as well as the lightest analog digital model with a weight of 51 grams. The aforementioned characteristics allowed the model to achieve increased popularity among collectors. A solar powered model with Bluetooth time reception capabilities called the GA-B2100 was released in 2022. The 2100 series of G-Shock would later go on to span a full metal variation, called the GM-B2100 in 2022. An MRG variation based on the design called the MRG-B2100 was introduced in 2024.

In October 2023, Casio announced the "Dream Project # 2" (G-D001) as part of their 40th anniversary celebrations. The watch was designed by a team of young designers and generative AI which designed a full metal structure with organic forms and shapes enhancing shock resistance and weight reduction without the need for rubber dampers. The watch also features a unique see through module having a main metal face plate, silicone cog wheels and 55 ruby bearings showing the internal working of the components. The solar powered module is powered by solar cell technology used in satellites with light powering the solar cells through a small gap in the date window. The watch case, case back and band are constructed entirely of 18-karat hand polished solid gold with the watch coming with time keeping features standard on many G-Shock models such as a chronograph, alarm, dual time display and multi-band 6 time reception technology. The watch comes with a special box with a slide-open door with perforations containing the model numbers of different G-Shock watches. The box also comes with a special LED light inside the box to keep the watch charged during storage. Only one unit was produced with the watch auctioned off at Phillips Auction House during The New York Watch Auction: NINE held in New York on 10 December 2023 with the winning bid amounting to US$400,050 (US$315,000 plus buyer's premium) making it the most expensive Casio and G-Shock watch ever produced.

In December 2024, Casio launched their first ring watch for their 50th anniversary. The model CRW-001 was a huge success and Casio struggled to meet the demand. Following the success of CRW-001, Casio launched in November 2025 G-Shock Nano Ring watch DWN-5600 in three colors.

== Multi-Band 6 ==
The Multi-Band 6 is a radio control technology first introduced on the GW9200 Riseman in 2008 and is a successor to the Multi-Band 5 (which supported synchronisation with five atomic time transmitters around the world) and Wave Ceptor (which supported synchronisation with atomic time transmitters present in the United States and Japan only) technologies. G-Shock watches with Multi-Band 6 technology can synchronise with one of the six atomic time transmitters in the world in order to keep accurate time. The following is a list of the six atomic time transmitters:

Japan

Watches can tune in to two locations:

The 40 kHz signal from JJY at Mount Otakadoya, near Fukushima (Ohtakadoyayama).

The 60 kHz signal from the Haganeyama Transmitter at Mount Hagane (Haganeyama).

China

Watches tune to the 68.5 kHz signal from BPC at Shangqiu. This is the newest additional signal; older multi-band 5 watches will not be able to connect to this signal, and must be upgraded to a newer multi-band 6 watch in order to synchronise from there.

United States

Watches tune to the 60 kHz signal from WWVB at Fort Collins.

United Kingdom

Watches tune to the 60 kHz MSF at Anthorn.

Germany

Watches tune to the 77.5 kHz low frequency time signal radio station DCF77 at Mainflingen.

== Guinness World Record ==
On 12 December 2017, the G-Shock earned the Guinness World Record for the heaviest vehicle to drive over a watch. The officials from Guinness World Record drove a 24.97-tonne truck over the Casio G-Shock DW5600E-1. The G-Shock is the first watch by any company being able to withstand the challenge.

== Modifications ==
G-Shock watches have developed an aftermarket modification community, with enthusiasts customizing both their appearance and functionality. Common modifications include replacing the original resin bezels and straps with aftermarket components made from stainless steel and other materials, as well as changing display colors through polarizing film replacement.

Modifications can also extend beyond cosmetic changes. Some enthusiasts open the watch case to replace display polarizers or install alternative electronic modules. One such modification is modifying the polarizer to make the watch face display negative. Another modification is removing the original circuit board and swapping it for a custom board that allows for additional functionality.

Casio has also introduced official personalization services. It's My G-Shock service allows customers to select combinations of bezels, bands, buttons, and other components to create individualized watches.

== List of models ==
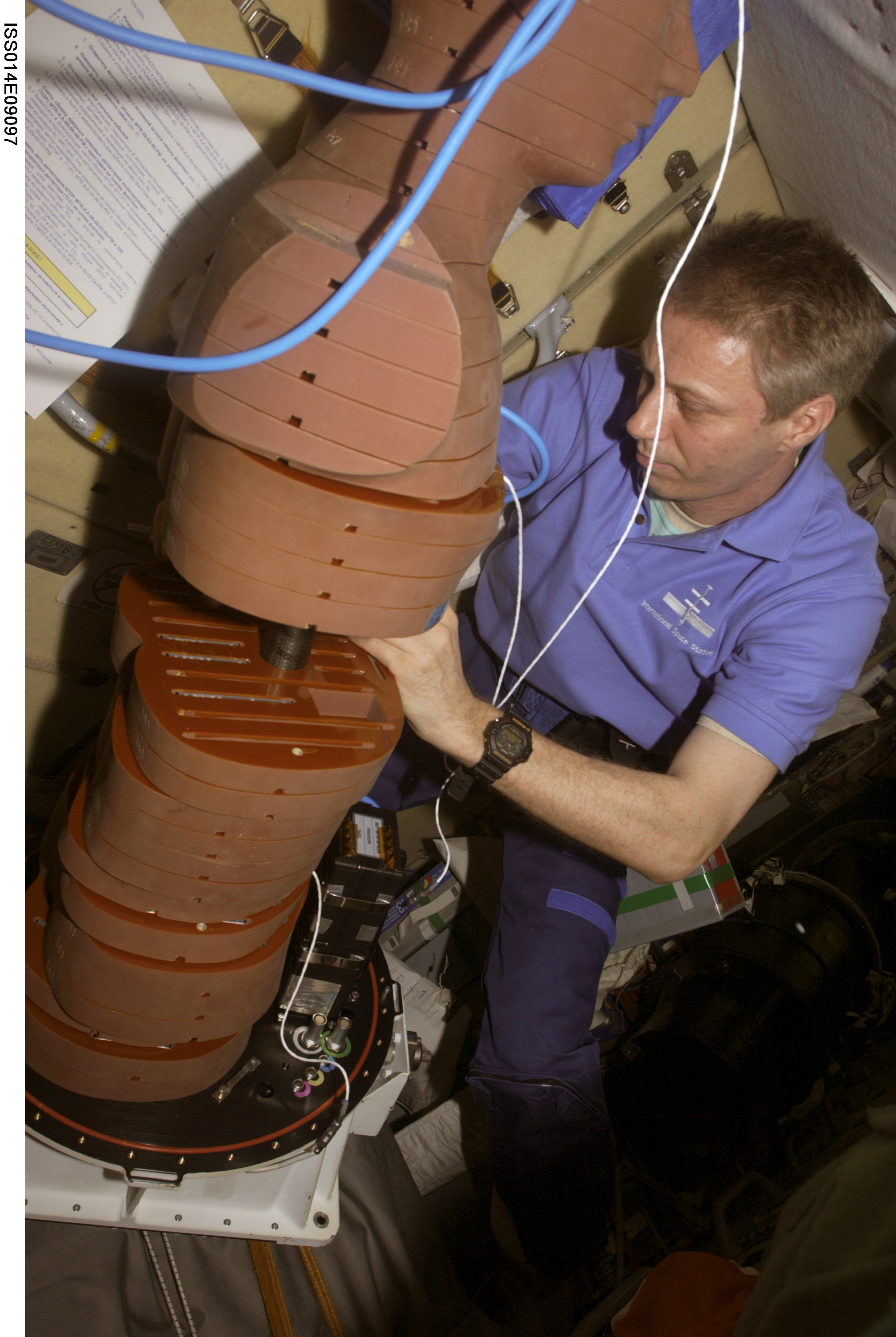
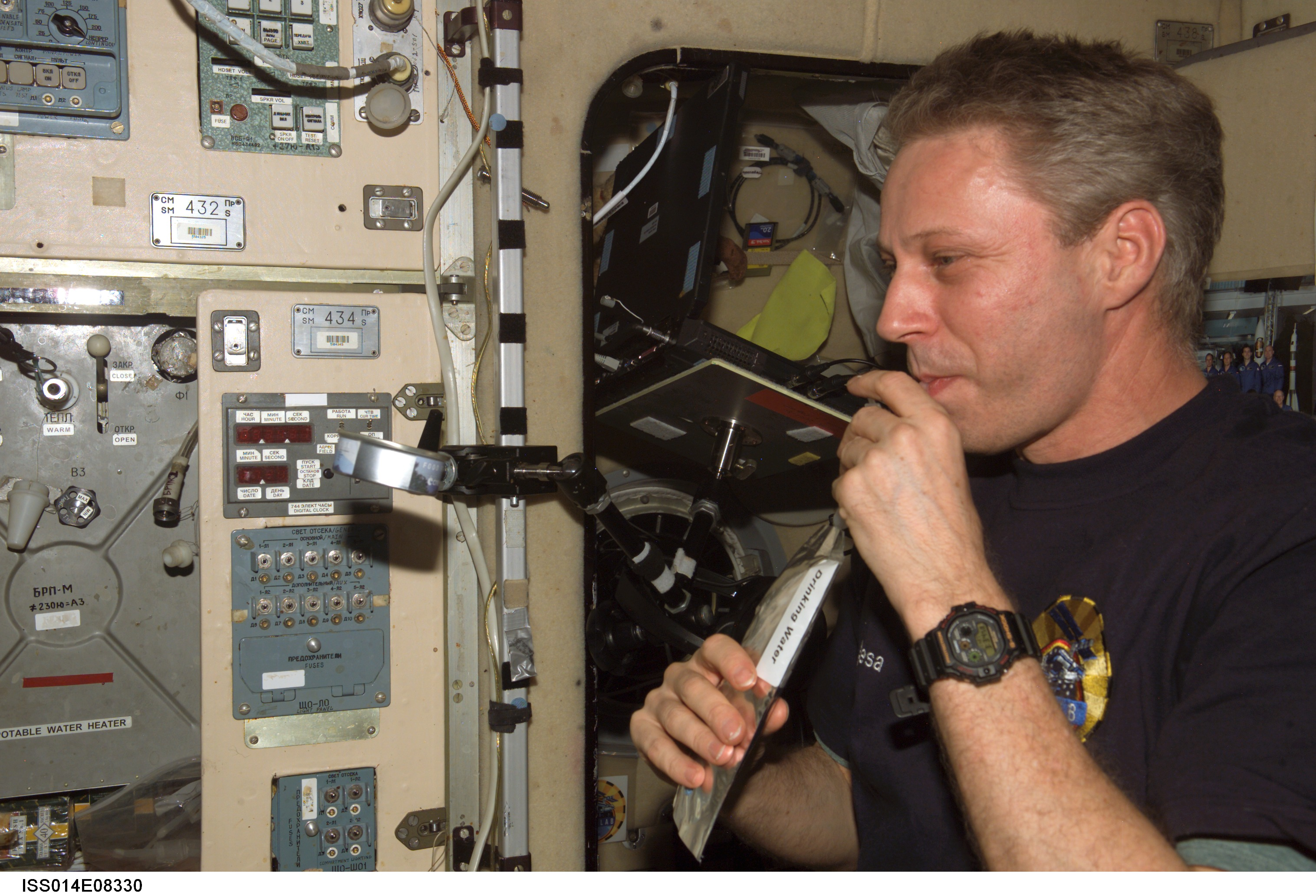
Astronaut Thomas Reiter during the 2006 Expedition 14 wearing a G-Shock DW-5900 on the International Space Station

=== Master of G ===
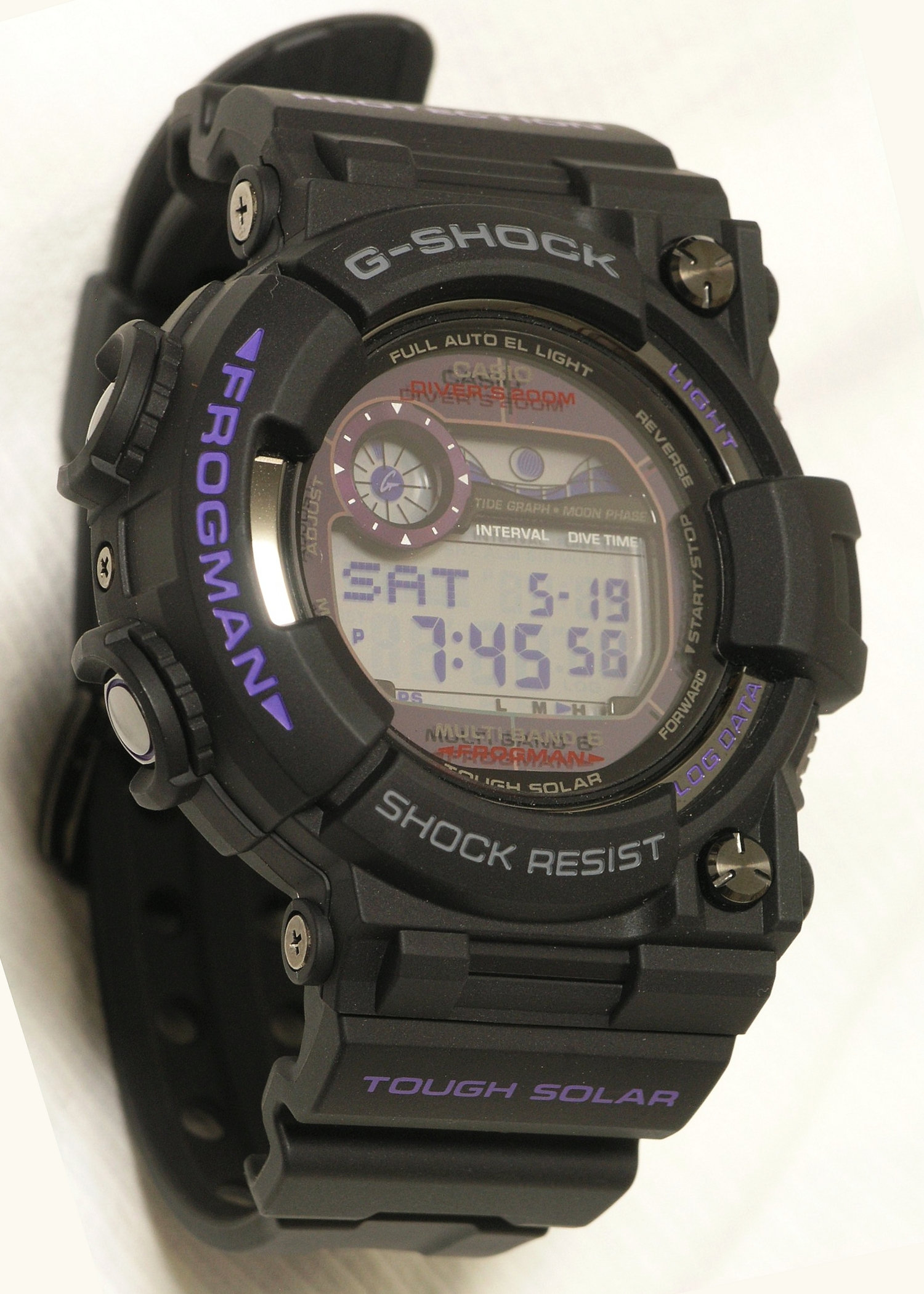
Casio GWF-1000 Frogman

The Master of G series is the specialty line of G-shocks which were used to introduce new features that would eventually make their way to the standard production models. The lineup consists of:

- Frogman
- Mudman
- Wademan
- Raysman
- Lungman
- Fisherman
- Riseman
- Gaussman
- Seaman
- Antman
- Gulfman
- Rangeman
- Mudmaster
- Gulfmaster
- Gravitymaster

=== G-Lide Surfing editions ===
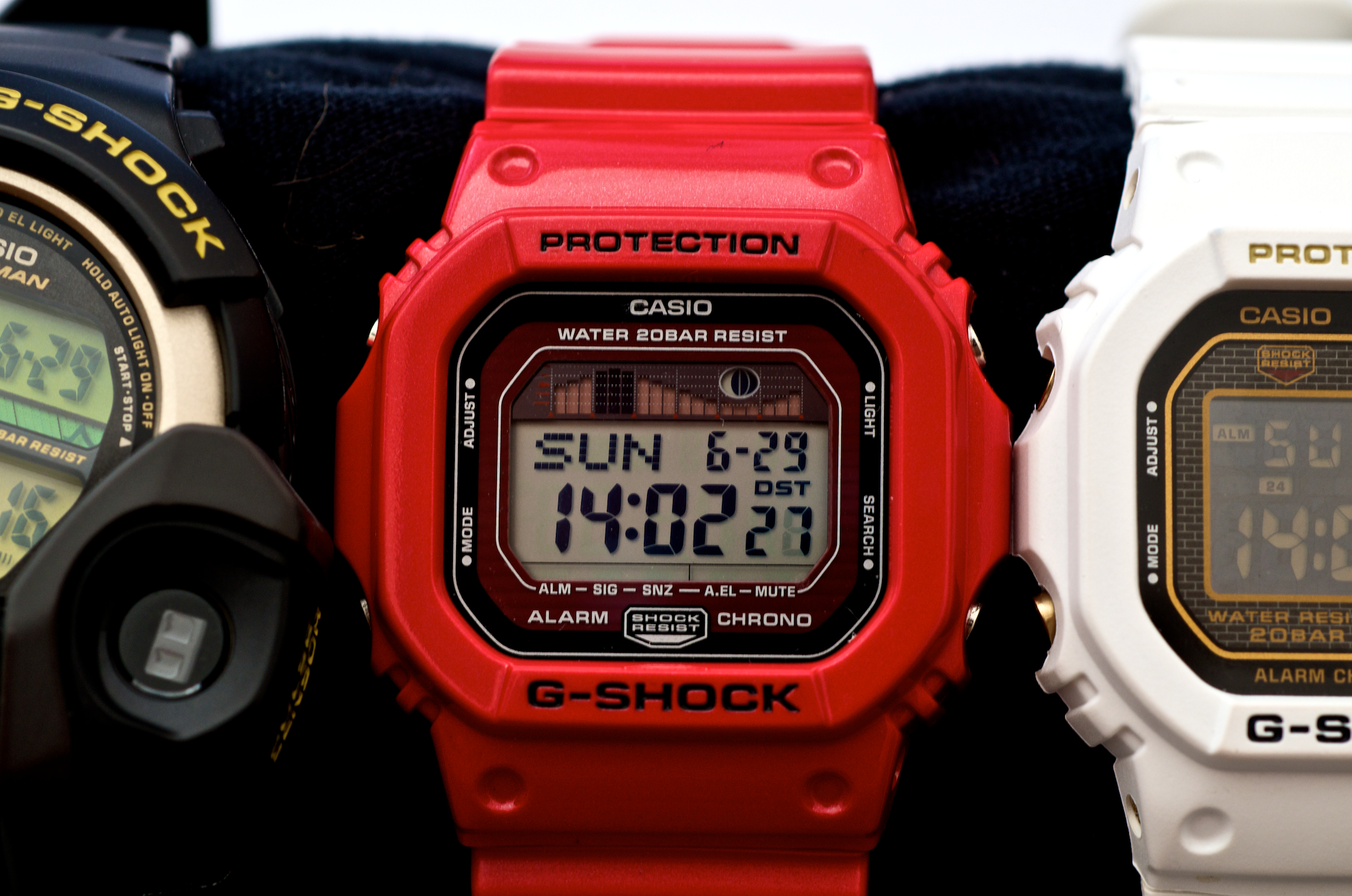
Casio GLX-5600

These models were released in 1996, designed and specifically made for the surfing market. The countdown timers on these models were designed to count down for surfing competitions, while some of the later models have a yacht timer, moon and tide graphs so a surfer can keep track of the progress while competing on the water. Many of these models came equipped with a pair of strap adapters and a single one-piece resin or nylon band. These styles of band are also known as "crossband" in the Japanese domestic market. Resin bands for these models had open gaps or slits through the band. Casio refers to them as drainage slits; the idea is that water will drain out with no problems while in action when surfing. Most of these series models had a translucent band. These models were branded as X-Treme for the Japanese domestic market.

==== X-Treme Snow Board/Skateboard Editions ====
These models are identical to the surfing editions, and also released in 1996. They were designed for snowboarding and skateboarding competitors and competitions. The only difference is that these models came with nylon velcro bands.

=== Original models/Squares ===
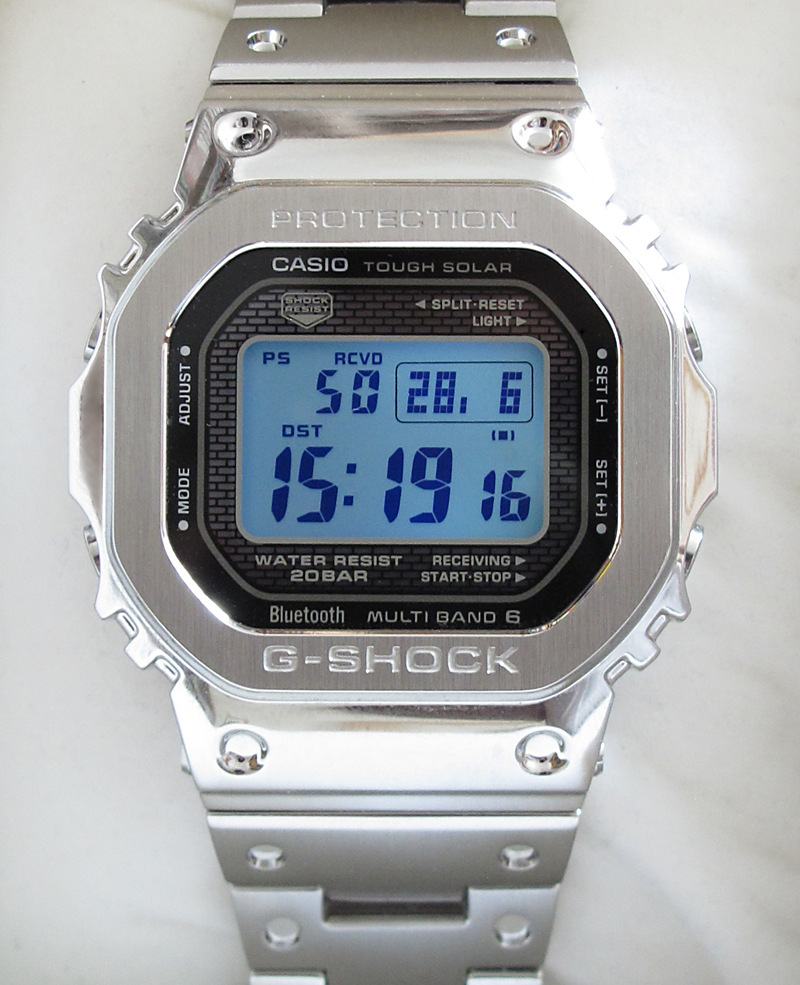
Casio GMW-B5000 square with a stainless steel case, bezel and bracelet

- DW-5000
- WW-5100
- DW-5200
- WW-5300
- DW-5500
- DW-5600C
- DW-5600E/5600UE
- DW-056
- DW-D5600
- GM-5600
- GW-5000/5000U
- GW-5510
- GW-5500J/5600J
- GWM-5600
- GWM-5610/5610U
- GW-S5600/S5600U
- GL-200
- GLS-5600
- GLX-5600
- GWX-5600
- GMW-B5000
- GX-56
- GWX-56
- G-D5000-9JR
- GW-B5600
- GBX-100
- G-5600
- G-5600E/G-5600UE

=== Vintage/Classic Models ===
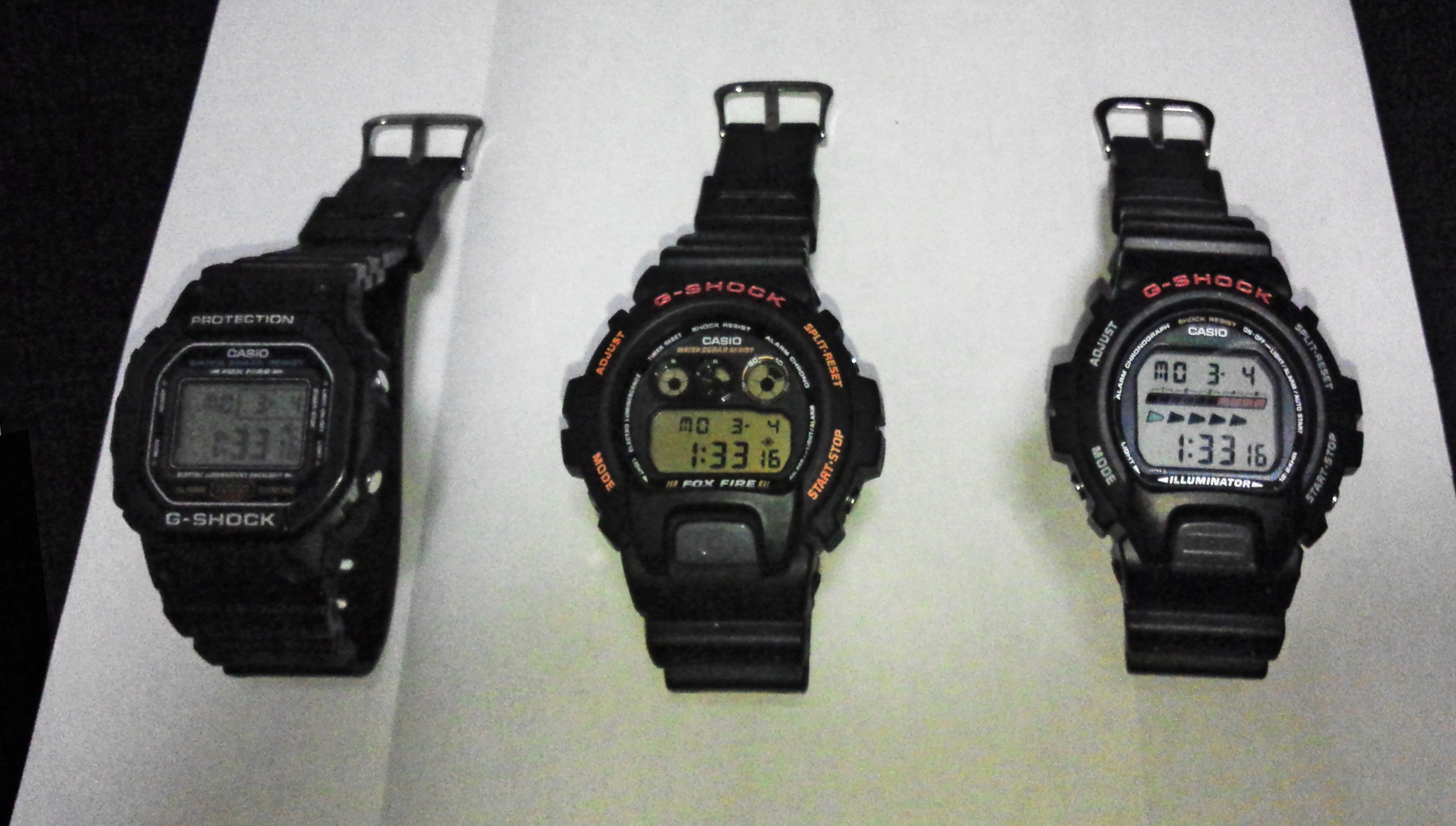
(From L to R) Casio DW-5600E, DW-6900 and DW-6600

- AW-500
- AW-550
- DW-5400
- DW-5700
- DW-5800
- DW-5900
- DW-6000
- DW-6100
- DW-6200
- DW-6300 (Frogman)
- DW-6400
- DW-6500
- DW-6600
- DW-6700
- DW-6800
- DW-6900
- DW-8000
- DW-8100
- DW-8200
- DW-8300
- DW-8400 (Mudman)
- DW-8500
- DW-8600 (Fisherman)
- DW-8700
- DW-8800
- DW-8900 (MRG-100)
- DW-9000
- DW-9050
- DW-9051
- DW-9052
- DW-9100 (Riseman)
- DW-9200
- DW-9300 (Raysman)
- DW-9400
- DW-9500
- DW-9600
- DW-9700 (Gulfman)
- DW-9800 (Wademan)
- DW-9900
- DW-9950 (Seaman)
- DW-001
- DW-002
- DW-003

=== Standard Analog-Digital Models ===
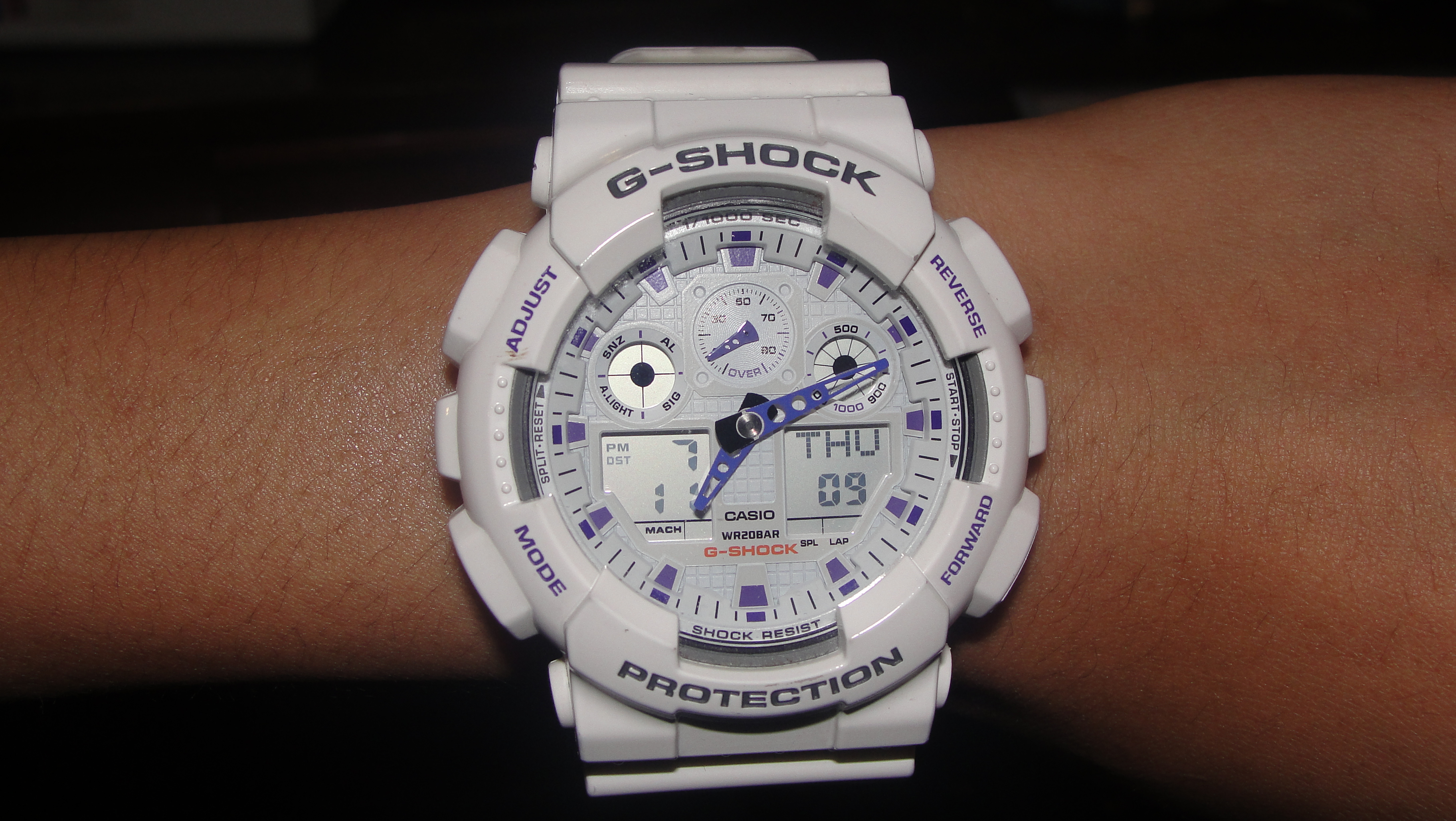
The GA-100 is a popular analog-digital G-Shock

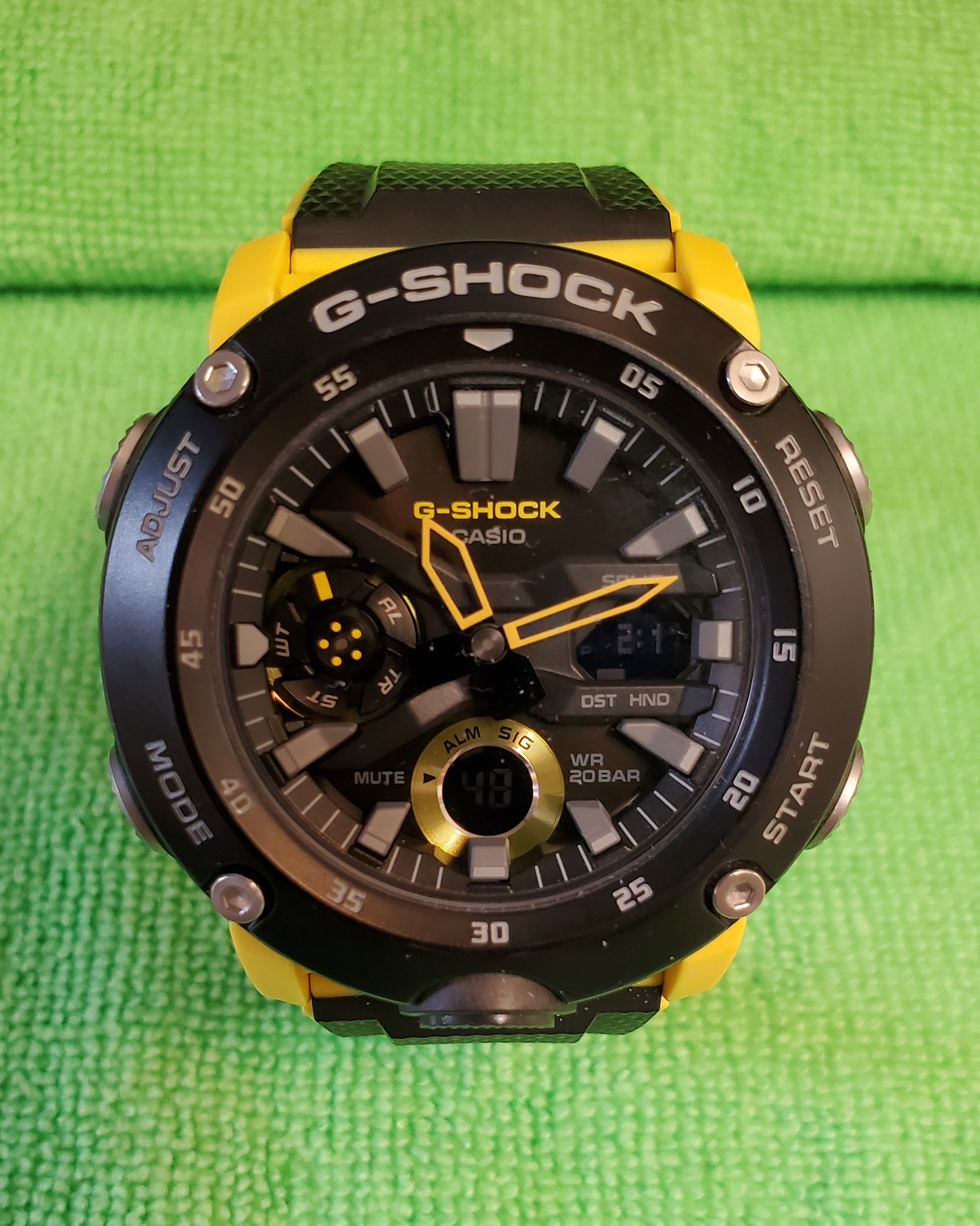
The GA-2000

- G-100
- GA-010
- GA-100
- GA-110
- GA-120
- GA-140
- GA-150
- GA-200
- GA-400
- GA-500
- GA-700
- GA-800
- GA-900
- GA-2000
- GA-2100
- GA-B2100
- GM-B2100
- GBM-2100
- GA-2200
- GA-2300

=== Metal-Twisted G-Shock (MTG) ===
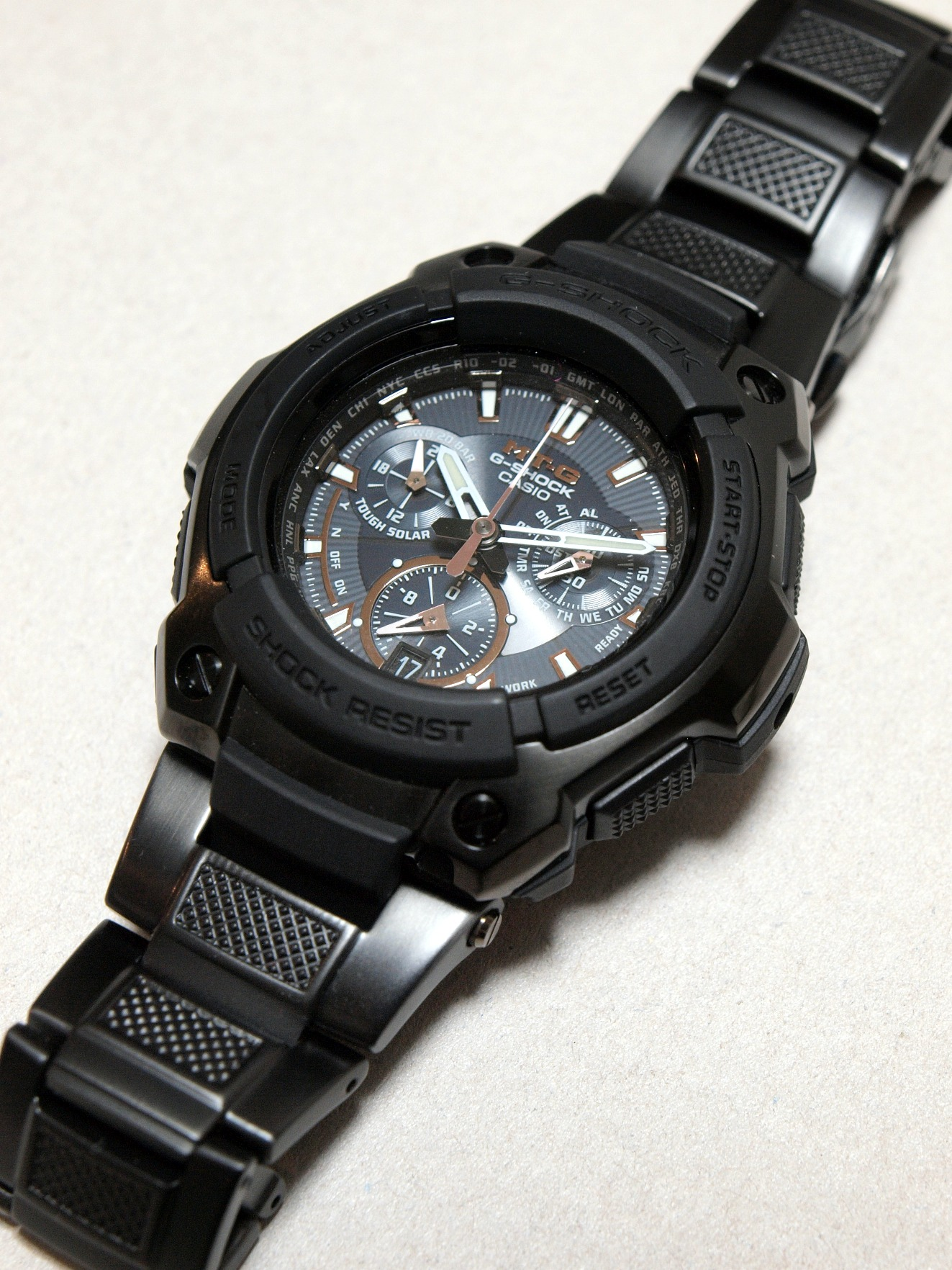
Casio MTG-1000

- MTG-100 (2000)
- MTG-110 (2000)
- MTG-500 (2000)
- MTG-120 (2001)
- MTG-510 (2002)
- MTG-520 (2002)
- MTG-700/800 (2002)
- MTG-900 (2003)
- MTG-920 (2004)
- MTG-910 (2005)
- MTG-1000 (2008)
- MTG-1500 (2009)
- MTG-1100 (2009)
- MTG-1200 (2011)
- MTG-M900 (2012)
- MTG-S1000 (2013)
- MTG-G1000 (2015)
- MTG-B1000 (2018)
- MTG-B2000 (2020)
- MTG-B3000 (2022)

=== MR-G Series ===
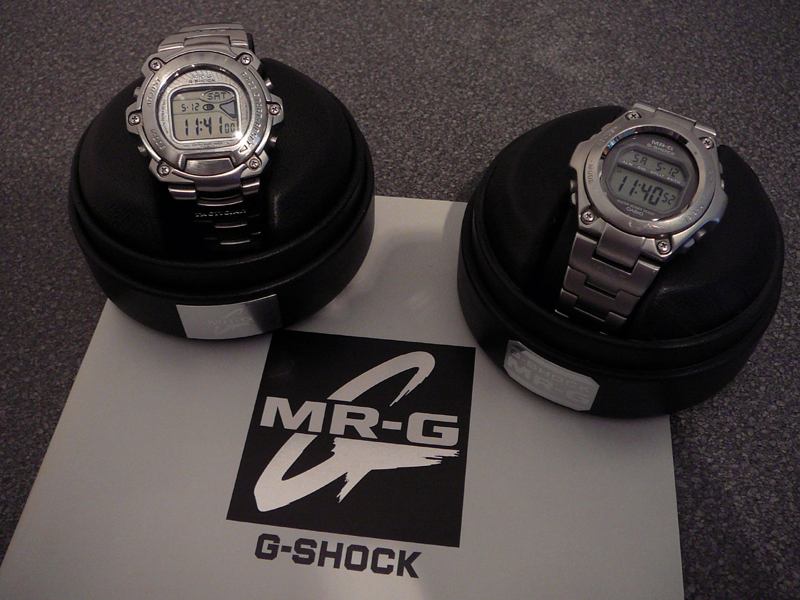
Casio MRG-1000 with the MRG-100, the first full metal G-Shock

- MRG-1
- MRG-100
- MRG-110
- MRG-120
- MRG-130
- MRG-131
- MRG-200
- MRG-210
- MRG-220
- MRG-1000
- MRG-1100 (Frogman)
- MRG-1200
- MRG-3000
- MRG-7000
- MRG-7100
- MRG-7500
- MRG-7600
- MRG-7700
- MRG-8000
- MRG-8100
- MRG-G1000
- MRG-B1000
- MRG-BF1000R (Frogman)
- MRG-G2000
- MRG-B2000
- MRG-B2100
- MRG-B5000

== See also ==
- Casio
- Casio F-91W
- Casio Wave Ceptor
- Master of G

== Art Book ==
- Ariel Adams: G-SHOCK, Rizzoli, 2023, ISBN 978-0-8478-7318-0
