= Casio Wave Ceptor =

Radio-controlled wristwatch brand

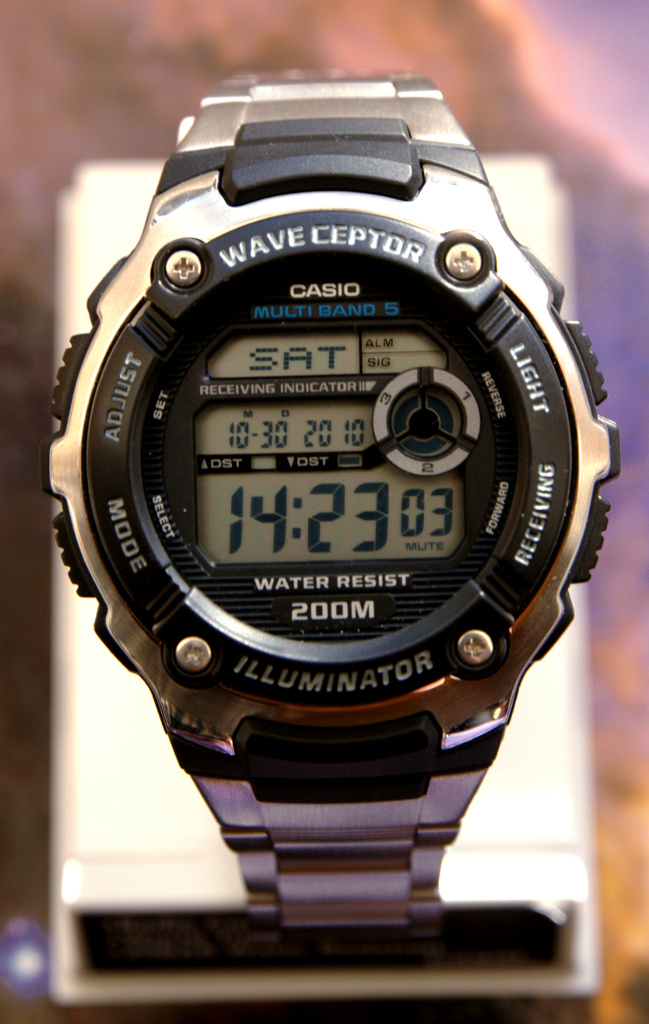
A Casio Wave Ceptor WV-200DE watch. The Multi-Band 5 indicates that it can receive time calibration signals from five radio towers in the world

The Wave Ceptor series (stylized as WAVE CEPTOR or WaveCeptor) is a line of radio-controlled watches by Casio. Wave Ceptor watches synchronise with radio time signals broadcast by various government time services around the world. These signals transmit the time measured by atomic clocks accurate to one second in millions of years. By synchronizing daily with the signals, the Wave Ceptor watches achieve high accuracy, using a quartz crystal to keep time in the interim. Some radio watches, including some Wave Ceptors, are solar-powered, supported by a rechargeable battery. The watch displays may be fully digital, analog, or analog-digital. Hybrid Wave Ceptor models support GPS satellite reception of both time and location, in addition to broadcast signals.

Radio-controlled watches require no setting of time and date, or daylight saving time adjustments, as they attempt automatic synchronization several times every night. Without synchronisation, Wave Ceptors, like other commercial quartz timepieces, are typically accurate to ± 15 seconds per month; daily synchronization ensures 500 ms accuracy.

Most Wave Ceptor watches have a signal strength indicator which shows if the time signal is strong enough to correct the time set. The number of transmitters to which the watches can tune vary according to watch model; most watches can tune to any one of several time signal broadcasts around the world. In Europe, the stated reception range is approximately 1,500 kilometres.

Later Casio radio-controlled watches are branded as the basic Wave Ceptor and more expensive Lineage and Oceanus lines. More recent watches that connect to a smartphone with Bluetooth get Internet time from the phone, without requiring long-distance radio reception.

== Locations ==
Casio watches synchronise to radio time signals from one or more of six low frequency time signal transmitters. The 60kHz signals from different transmitters are not compatible with each other; a watch designed for WWVB only cannot receive MSF.

Japan

Watches can receive signals from two JJY transmitters:

The 40kHz signal from Mount Otakadoya, near Fukushima (Ohtakadoyayama).

The 60kHz signal from the Haganeyama Transmitter at Mount Hagane (Haganeyama).

China

Watches receive the 68kHz signal from BPC at Shangqiu.

United States

Watches receive the 60kHz signal from WWVB at Fort Collins.

Europe

Watches can receive either the 60kHz MSF at Anthorn or the 77.5kHz DCF77 at Mainflingen.

As an example, Casio Wave Ceptors using modules 3353 and 3354, such as the WVA-440, can tune to signals from both DCF77 (Germany) and MSF (UK). The two submodels use the same electronics module, but with a soldered jumper selecting preferential tuning first to DCF77, or to MSF. This is default behaviour after a factory reset; the user can choose to use either one of the two transmitters with either module, although this limits use when travelling within Europe.

== Multi-Band 6 ==
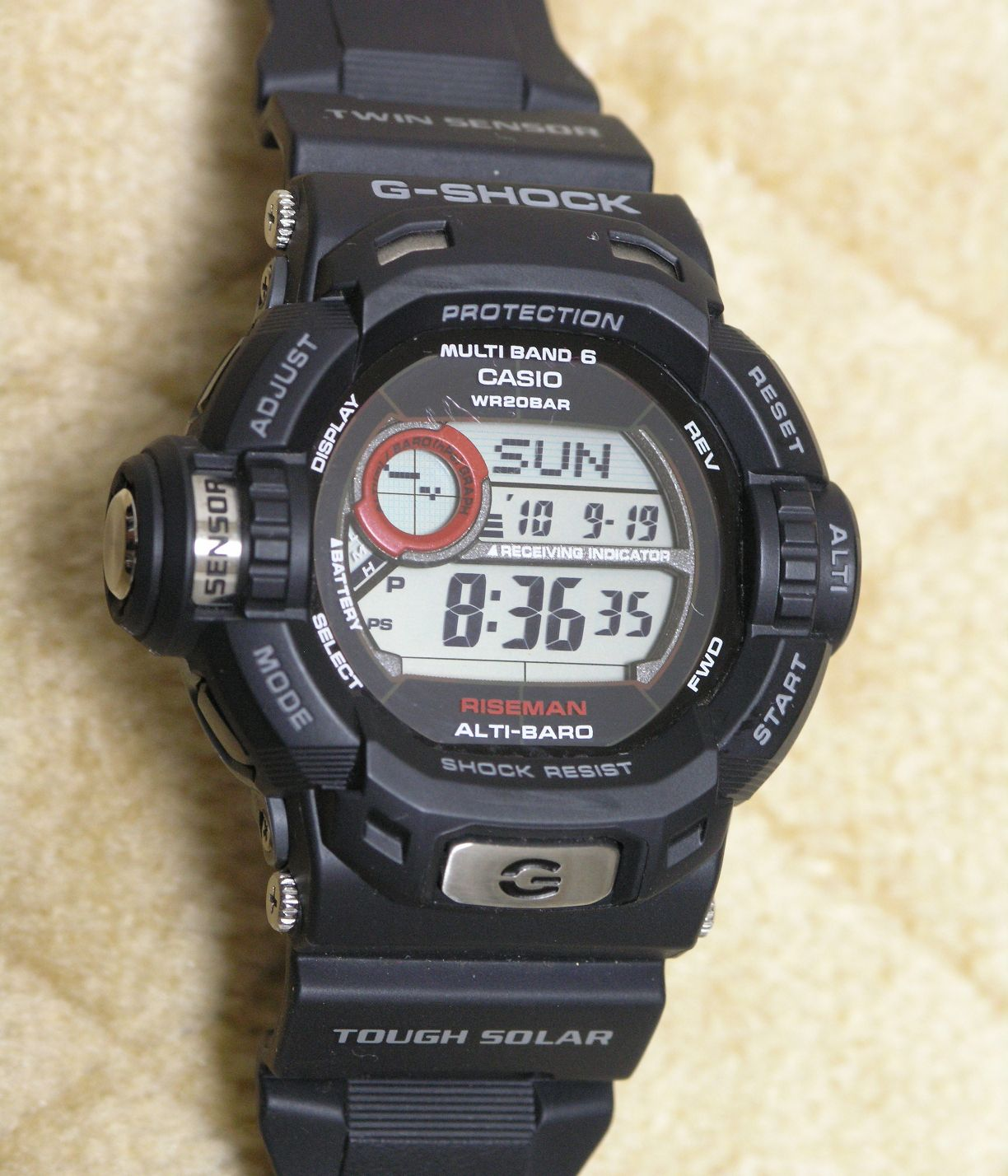
A Casio G-Shock GW-9200J "Riseman" watch incorporating Multi-band 6 technology

Casio Multi-Band 6 watches can tune to six global low frequency radio time broadcasts. Some of the Casio G-Shock line of watches have Multi-Band 6 technology. The earlier Multi-Band 5 system could not receive the signal of the Chinese time signal transmitter. The Multi-Band 6 technology was first used in 2008, and first appeared on the "Riseman".

== Other radio watches ==
Later Casio radio-controlled watches are branded Wave Ceptor if with resin case and glass crystal, Lineage if solar with metal case and digital display and sapphire crystal (using the same modules and functionality). There is also a much higher-priced Oceanus line. Other makers of radio-controlled watches include Japanese manufacturers Seiko and Citizen Watch, and German manufacturer Junghans.

== See also ==
- Atomic clock
- Radio clock
