= Casio Edifice =

Range of premium watches manufactured by Japanese electronics company Casio

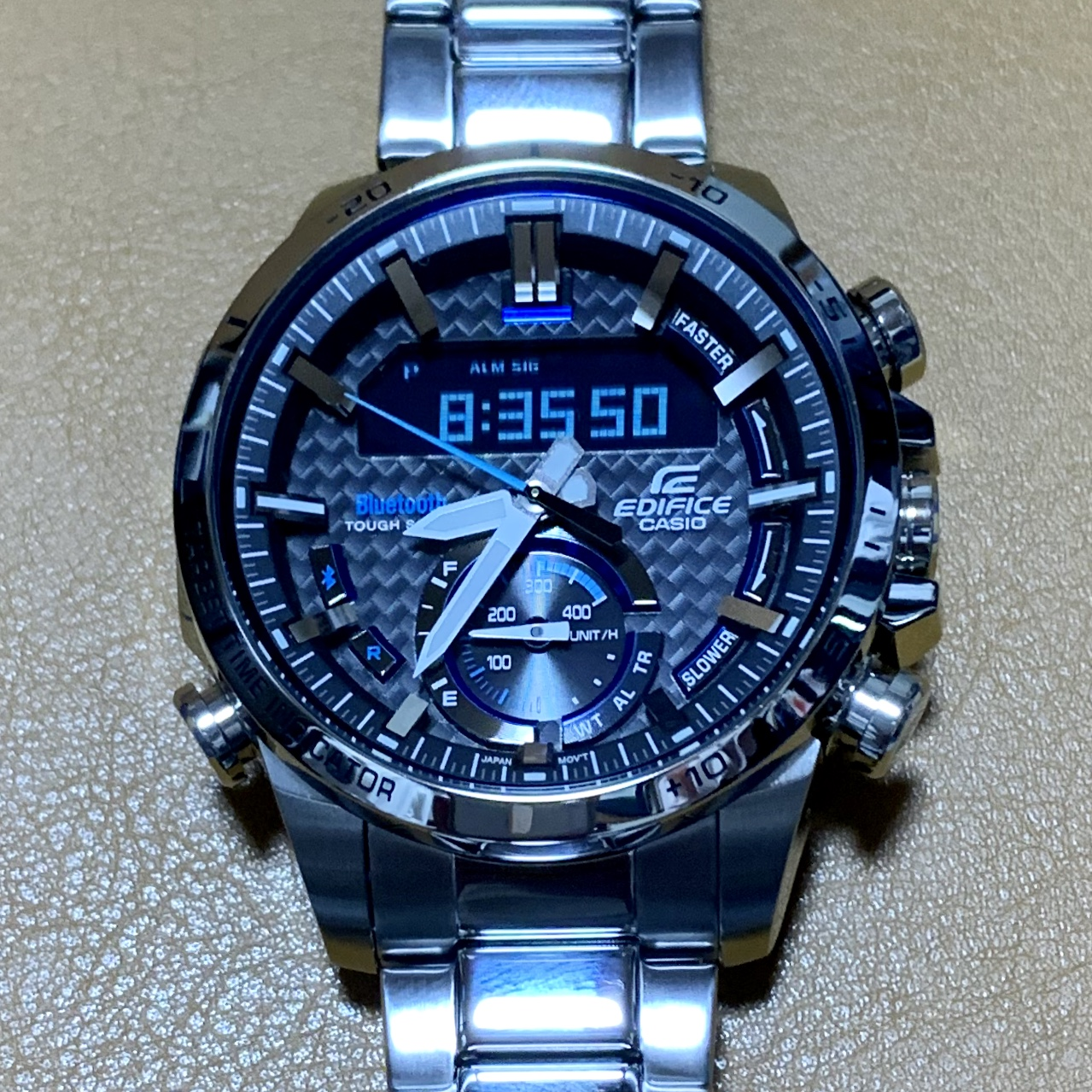
EDIFICE ECB-800D-1A

Edifice are a brand of watches manufactured by the Japanese electronics company Casio. The Edifice watches are designed to attract buyers engaged in professional careers. The watches have multiple functions, ranging from multiple dials to world time and multiple alarms.

== Technology ==
Edifice watches range from basic chronograph to more advanced models with more computerised movements. Many Edifice watches utilise Tough Solar, Casio's brand name for solar powered batteries. More advanced models are "Waveceptors" which can calibrate themselves with atomic clocks via radio waves. Some models have Bluetooth connectivity which enable them to be monitored via a smart phone and to share chronograph data. The display of the watches in the Edifice range are variable from a purely analogue display to a display combining analogue and digital displays (also called Ana-Digi).

== Sponsorship ==
=== Motorsport ===
Edifice have been an official sponsor of Scuderia Toro Rosso since 2016 and remained with the team as they renamed themselves to Scuderia AlphaTauri in 2020.

Edifice also sponsor Honda's motorsport division Honda Racing, Nissan's motorsport division Nismo, TOM's Racing Team and the Japanese Inter Proto Series.

The partnership with STR, SAT and Honda Racing has resulted in the release of special edition watches.

== See also ==
- Casio
- G Shock watches
