= Masters on Photonic Networks Engineering =

The Master's on Photonic Networks engineering (MAPNET) is a European Union Erasmus Mundus Master's programme.

== Overview ==
The Master's study programme has 30 ECTS by semester and is divided into four semesters. In the programme the first three semesters are designed as courses, laboratory sessions, and the last semester is based an independent work for the Masters thesis. This program is offered by the four universities:

- Sant'Anna School of Advanced Studies
- Technische Universität Berlin
- Aston University
- Osaka University

== Associated members ==
- Ericsson - Sweden
- Deutsche Telekom - Germany
- Mitsubishi Electric - Japan
- Fujitsu - Japan
- National Institute of Information and Communications Technology - Japan
