= Master of G =

Range of premium G-Shock watch models manufactured by Casio

The Master of G is a line of G-Shock watches produced by Japanese electronics company Casio designed for usage in harsh environments. Many showcase new technology that Casio would eventually introduce into the G-Shock line of watches, such as an altimeter, digital compass and the Tough Solar feature.

== History ==
In 1985, Casio released the DW-5500C, which was the first G-Shock to feature a mud-resistant structure. Called the G-Shock-II due to the new construction feature, it was nicknamed "Mudman" by collectors due to its mud resistance capabilities. Casio would then go on to release a mud-resistant line of watches in 1995 which would go on to be called Mudman.

The Master of G series officially began in November 1993, when Casio introduced the G-Shock Frogman model in Japan; the case-back featured the word "FROGMAN" and a small figure of a diving frog. It was made for divers and featured a digital dive time mode. The model is made unique by its asymmetrical design of thick rubber shielding around a self-contained module which was to facilitate hand movement when the watch was worn over a diving suit and had a thick double-tang resin strap. The Frogman proved to be very popular and during the mid-1990s. Casio decided to produce more variations starting with the DW-8200 model, including limited edition colours. The DW-8200 model also featured a titanium case on some models in place of the stainless steel case used in the original Frogman.

The Master of G watches ceased production in 2000 with the exception of the Frogman which continued production and got a special MR-G variant dubbed the MR-G Frogman.

In 2006, the new Mudman models were introduced in the Master of G range of watches followed by the new Gulfman models in 2007.

Subsequent new models have since followed which have more advanced features. The Rangeman series was introduced in 2013 and has ABC (Altimeter, Barometer, Compass) features. The line was renamed MASTER in 2014, being continued with the previously named MAN line and now includes the Mudmaster (designed for people related for the army or people related with land related jobs), the Gravitymaster (designed for pilots or people related with aviation industry) and the Gulfmaster (designed for marine forces or people related with the naval industry).

== Characteristics ==
Master of G series watches are invariably amongst the largest G-Shock designs Casio produces, usually suited for those with larger wrists. They are almost always named with a "man" suffix after the initial Frogman model which itself was named for scuba divers.

Models in this series consist of a steel or (in most cases) a polyurethane case surrounded by a thick neoprene or polyurethane bezel providing outer protection. All models except the earliest Frogman models feature Casio's Illuminator display lighting system and are water resistant to 20 atmospheres (20bar/200metres) which thus makes them suitable for scuba-diving except at depths requiring helium-oxygen gas.

Some of the modules incorporate highly advanced functions. The Riseman features twin sensors that measure both temperature and atmospheric pressure, thus allowing it to serve as a barometer and altimeter. The Raysman was the first model to make use of Tough Solar technology to power its functions, the Wademan featured a digital compass, the Fisherman helped introduce the now-common tide graph and moonphase readouts, and the Antman was the first Casio watch that received an atomic signal that calibrated its timekeeping with atomic clock transponders in Japan.

Today, it is not unusual for two or more of these features to be found in a single Master of G model i.e. the GW-9200 Riseman has Tough Solar to power its radio-calibrated timekeeping and altimeter/barometer/thermometer functions; the GWF-1000 Frogman and GW-9110 Gulfman both feature solar power, radio timekeeping and tide and moon phase indicators. The current GW-9400 Rangeman with triple sensors has the most extensive feature sets so far, with mud/dust resistance, solar power, radio timekeeping, thermometer, barometer, altimeter, and digital compass functions, which have long been provided on Protrek/Pathfinder series. The GPR-B1000, which is the successor to the GW-9400, and is also named Rangeman, has advanced GPS functionality in addition to the triple sensor features of its predecessor.

== Models ==
- Antman (discontinued): GW-100
- Fisherman (discontinued): DW-8600, superseded by Gulfman.
- Frogman: Current models are: GWF-D1000, GWF-A1000, GW-8230 and MRG-BF1000R. Discontinued models are DW-6300, DW-8200, DW-9900, MRG-1100, GF-1000, GF-8200, GW-200 series and GWF-1000
- Gaussman (discontinued): AW-570, AW-571
- Gravitymaster: current models are GR-B200 (quad sensor with Bluetooth connectivity): GR-B300 (solar atomic with Bluetooth time reception): GA-1100 (battery powered with twin-sensors) and GA-1000 (battery powered with twin-sensors). Discontinued models are GR-B100 (solar powered with Bluetooth time reception): GWR-B1000 (solar-atomic with added Bluetooth connectivity and carbon fibre construction): GPW-1000 (solar powered with atomic time keeping and GPS time synchronization) and GPW-2000 (solar-atomic with GPS and Bluetooth connectivity)
- Gulfman (discontinued): G-9100 (battery powered): GW-9100 (solar-atomic) and GW-9110 (solar-atomic)
- Gulfmaster (discontinued): GWN-1000 (Analog/Digital, solar-atomic with triple sensors), GN-1000 (battery powered with twin sensors) and GWN-Q1000 (Analog/Digital, solar-atomic with quad sensors and carbon core construction)
- Lungman (discontinued): DWG-100 (pulse sensor)
- Mudman: Current models are G-9000 (battery powered) and GW-9500 (solar-atomic with triple sensors). Discontinued models are GW-9300 (solar-atomic with twin-sensors) and G-9300 (non-atomic: solar powered with twin-sensors)
- Mudmaster: current models are GWG-B1000 (solar atomic with triple sensor and added Bluetooth connectivity featuring forged carbon and metal construction), GWG-2000 (solar-atomic with triple sensor featuring forged carbon and metal construction), GG-1000 (battery powered with twin-sensors) and GG-B100 (battery powered with quad sensors and added Bluetooth connectivity). Discontinued models are GWG-1000 (solar-atomic with triple sensor), GWG-100 (solar-atomic) and GSG-100 (solar only).
- Rangeman: Current models is GPR-H1000 (Uses an unprecedented 6 sensors), is GW-9400 (Altimeter Barometer and Compass functions; solar-atomic). Discontinued model is GPR-B1000 (GPS capability and solar powered)
- Raysman (discontinued): DW-9300, DW-9350
- Revman (discontinued): MRG-1200
- Riseman (discontinued): GW-9200 (solar-atomic with twin-sensors), G-9200 (solar with twin-sensors)
- Seaman (discontinued): DW-9950
- Wademan (discontinued): DW-9800 (directional sensor)

=== Frogman ===
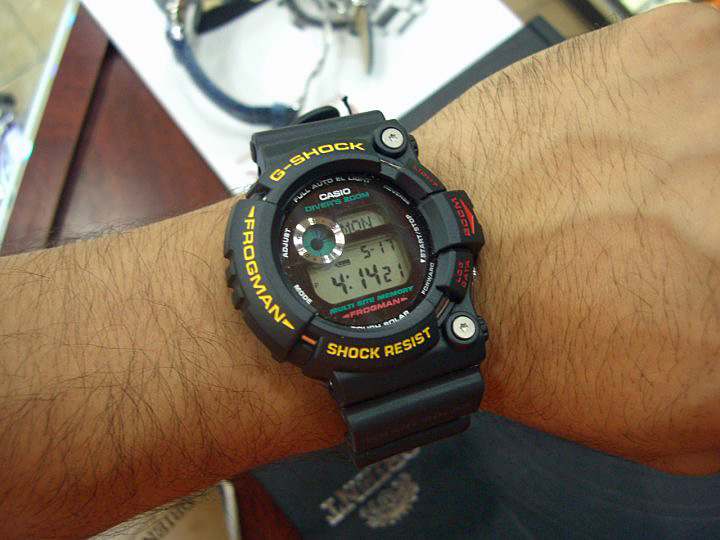
Wristshot of a Casio G-Shock Frogman. The pictured model is an older Frogman model "GW-200Z-1JF."

The Frogman was one of the first models of the Master of G line. The Frogman has an asymmetric shape and is attached eccentrically on its straps. It is specially made as a diving watch for scuba divers and is the only ISO 6425-compliant G-Shock line with a 200 m Divers rating.

The first Frogman model (DW-6300) was released in November 1993. While Casio started to use a newer, four-screw back plate for its watches around that time, the DW-6300 retained the older screw-on back plate design. In June 1995, a second generation of the Frogman model was introduced, the DW-8200. From then on the Frogman became very popular among G-Shock collectors and many special editions were started to be introduced.

A unique model in the Frogman lineup is the limited edition MRG-1100-2. This model was part of the MR-G series, a high-end G-Shock line of metal watches. While all other G-Shock models are constructed with resin bezels and straps, the MRG-1100-2 is constructed completely of titanium.

In April 1999, the DW-9900 model was introduced. This Frogman was slightly smaller than the DW-8200. For the next two years, both DW-8200 and DW-9900 models were produced. The DW-9900 seems to have been a less popular model as it was soon followed up with the solar-powered GW-200 models in June 2001. Except for the "Snake Killer" and the "Carbon Fiber Frogman" (GW-201-6JF and GW-201NT-1JF), this Frogman has the Tough Solar 2422 module. The last GW-200 series Frogman is the GW-200Z-1JF "Final Frogman" that was released in November 2009. The model has been around for at least seven years, longer than the DW-8200. Typically, the "GW" designation refers to G-Shocks that can receive time updates from radio signals, which are commonly called, though incorrectly, "atomic signals" But, no Frogman has been equipped with this feature prior to the release of the GWF-1000.

The GWF-1000 was introduced in September 2009 in Japan. It represents the fifth generation of the Frogman series. The GWF-1000 is now capable of receiving time updates from six locations worldwide (Mainflingen [Germany], Anthorn [England], Ft Collins [USA], Shangqiu [China] & Fukushima & Fukuoka/Saga [Japan]), while retaining ISO 6425 200 m water resistance, shock resistance, dive time measurement and solar power. It also incorporates a tide and moon graph function. Like the first generation Frogman, the GWF-1000 employs a stainless steel construction with the addition of diamond-like coating (DLC) to improve corrosion resistance.

Casio launched the model GWF-D1000 at Baselworld 2016. This includes the references GWF-D1000-1 and GWF-D1000B-1 (blue color accents). Besides the usual features such as "Tough Solar" sunlight-powered movement and atomic clock radio signal accuracy control system, the watch has three sensors, namely, temperature, depth gauge, and compass. The watch will log the user's dive time, track the depth, record the water temperature, and log the data for up to 20 dives. Other unique feature is the sapphire crystal.

In 2020 Casio unveiled their first analogue Frogman, the GWF-A1000. The new model features a carbon fibre reinforced resin case with a monocoque design. Further features include Bluetooth connectivity. In 2023, a premium variant of the GWF-A1000 slotted in the top-of-the-line MRG lineup called the MRG-BF1000R was introduced featuring titanium construction with a sapphire crystal insert in the caseback as well as an innovative strap changing mechanism.

=== Notable Firsts ===
- DW-8600 Fisherman (1996): First G-Shock having a tide-graph and moonphase feature. This model was a precursor to the more popular Gulfman series first introduced in 1998.
- DW-9300 Raysman (1998): First G-Shock to have tough solar battery recharging technology.
- DW-9800 Wademan (1999): First G-Shock with directional sensor.
- AW-571 Gaussman (1999): First G-Shock having magnetic field resistance.
- DWG-100 Lungman (1999): First G-Shock incorporating a pulse sensor.
- GW-100 Antman (2000): First G-Shock having the capability to receive time calibration signal from a radio tower.
- GW-9400 Rangeman (2013): First G-Shock incorporating triple sensors (pressure sensor, temperature sensor and direction sensor).
- GPW-1000 Gravitymaster (2016): First G-Shock having GPS-hybrid time reception technology.
- GWN-Q1000 Gulfmaster (2016): First G-Shock with quad sensors (pressure sensor, temperature sensor, depth sensor and direction sensor).
- GPR-B1000 Rangeman (2018): First G-Shock featuring GPS navigation and Memory-In-Pixel (MIP) display technology.

== Gallery ==
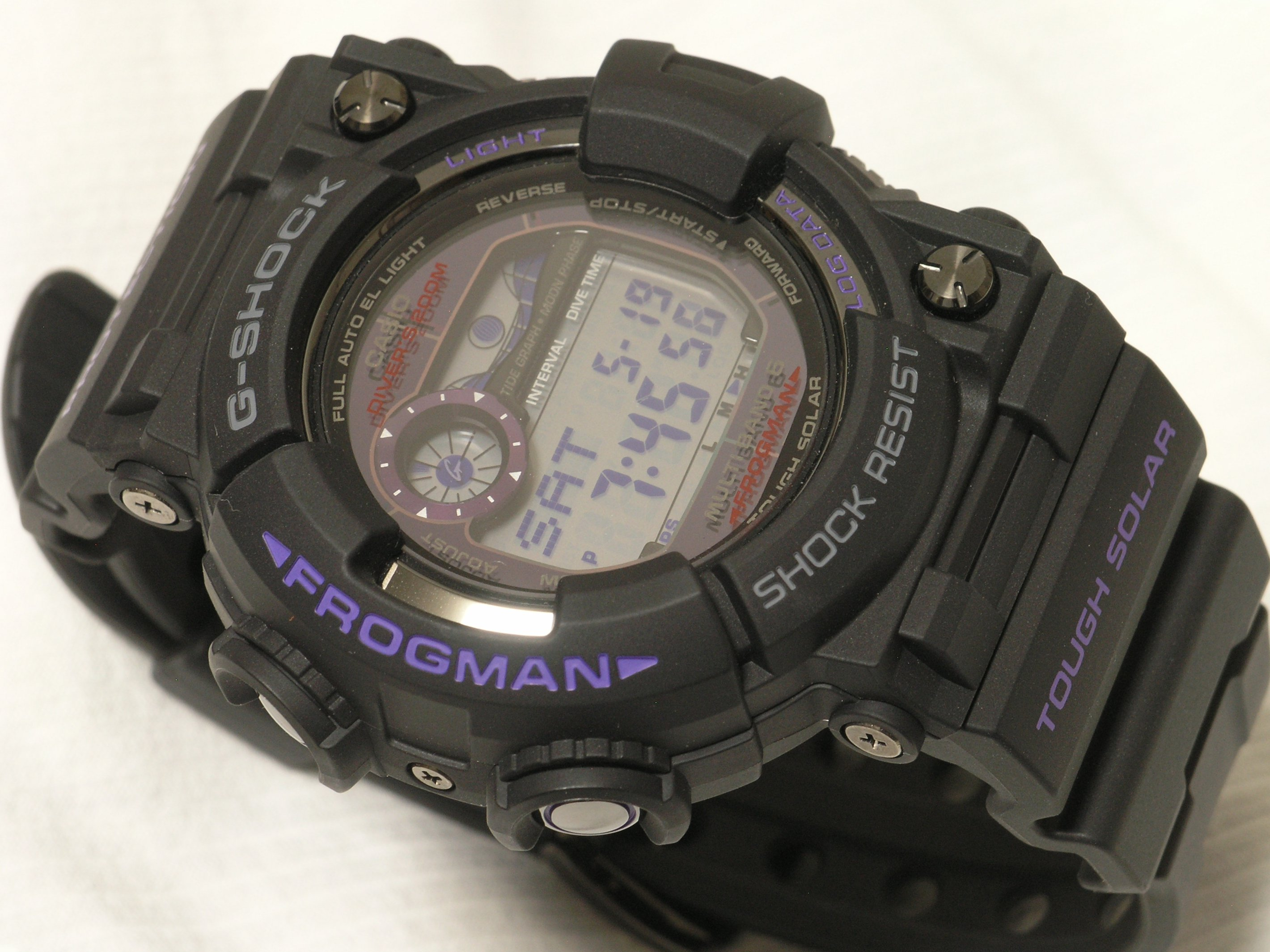
Frogman GWF-1000BP-1JF

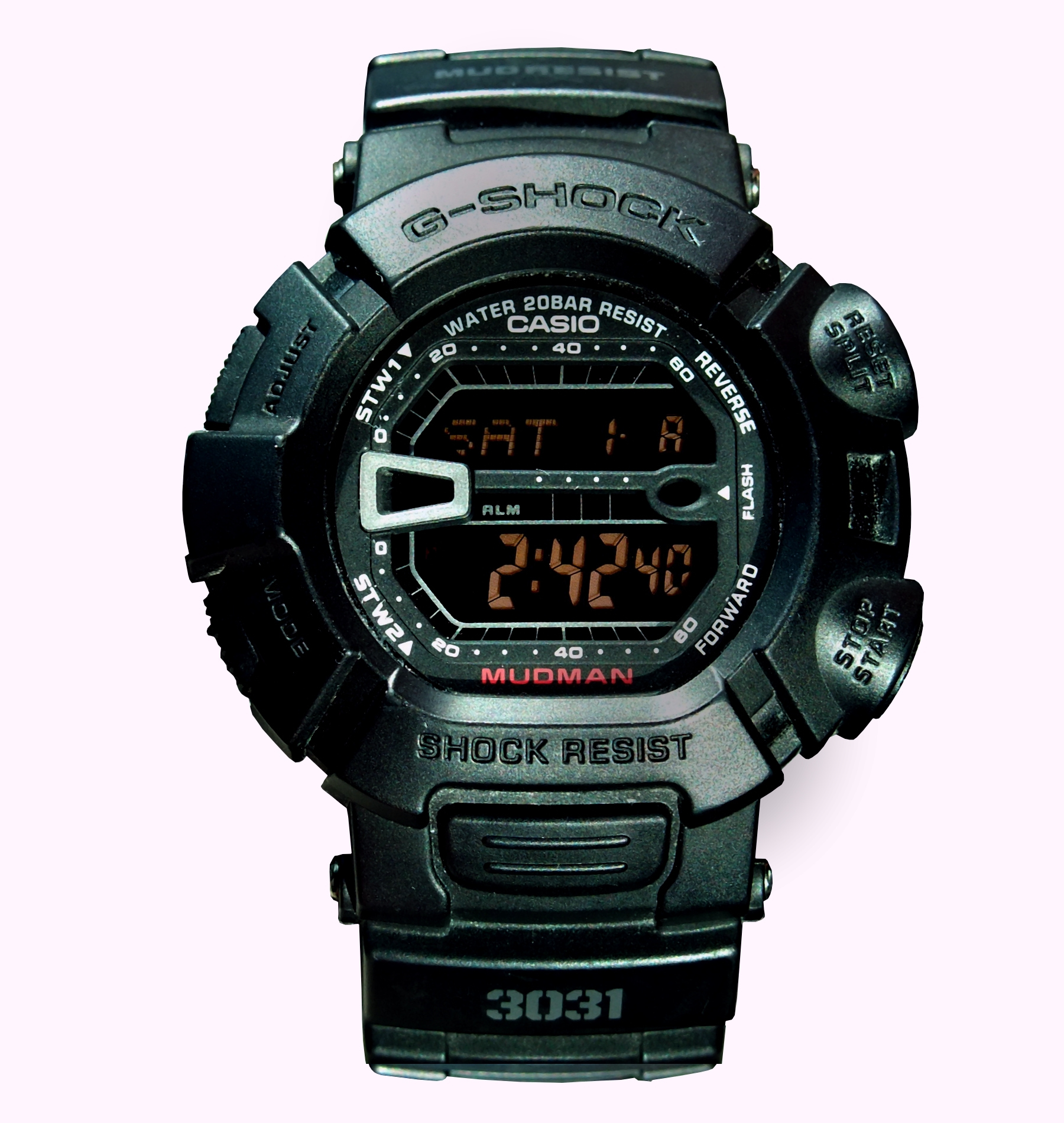
Mudman G9000MS-1

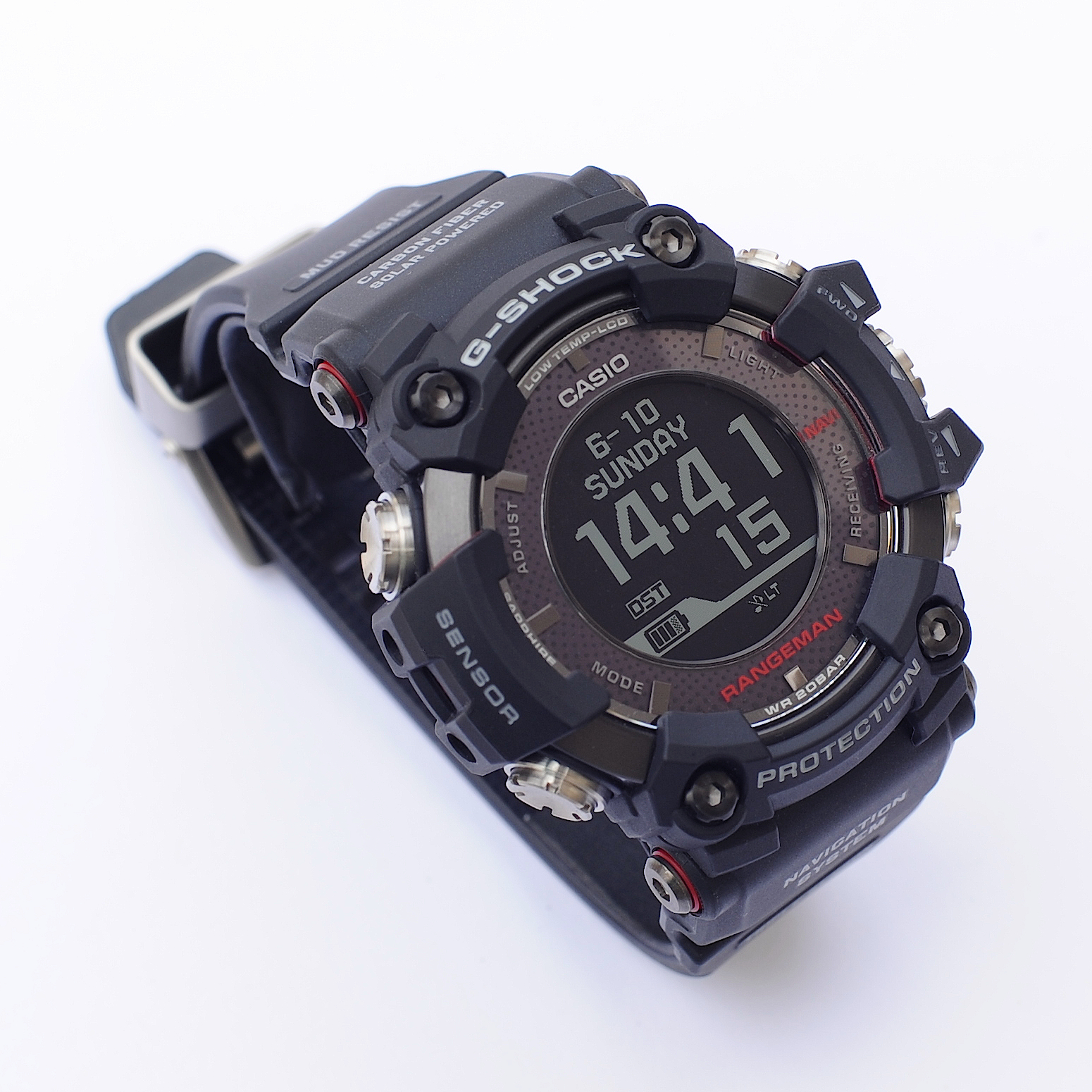
Rangeman GPR-B1000-1ER

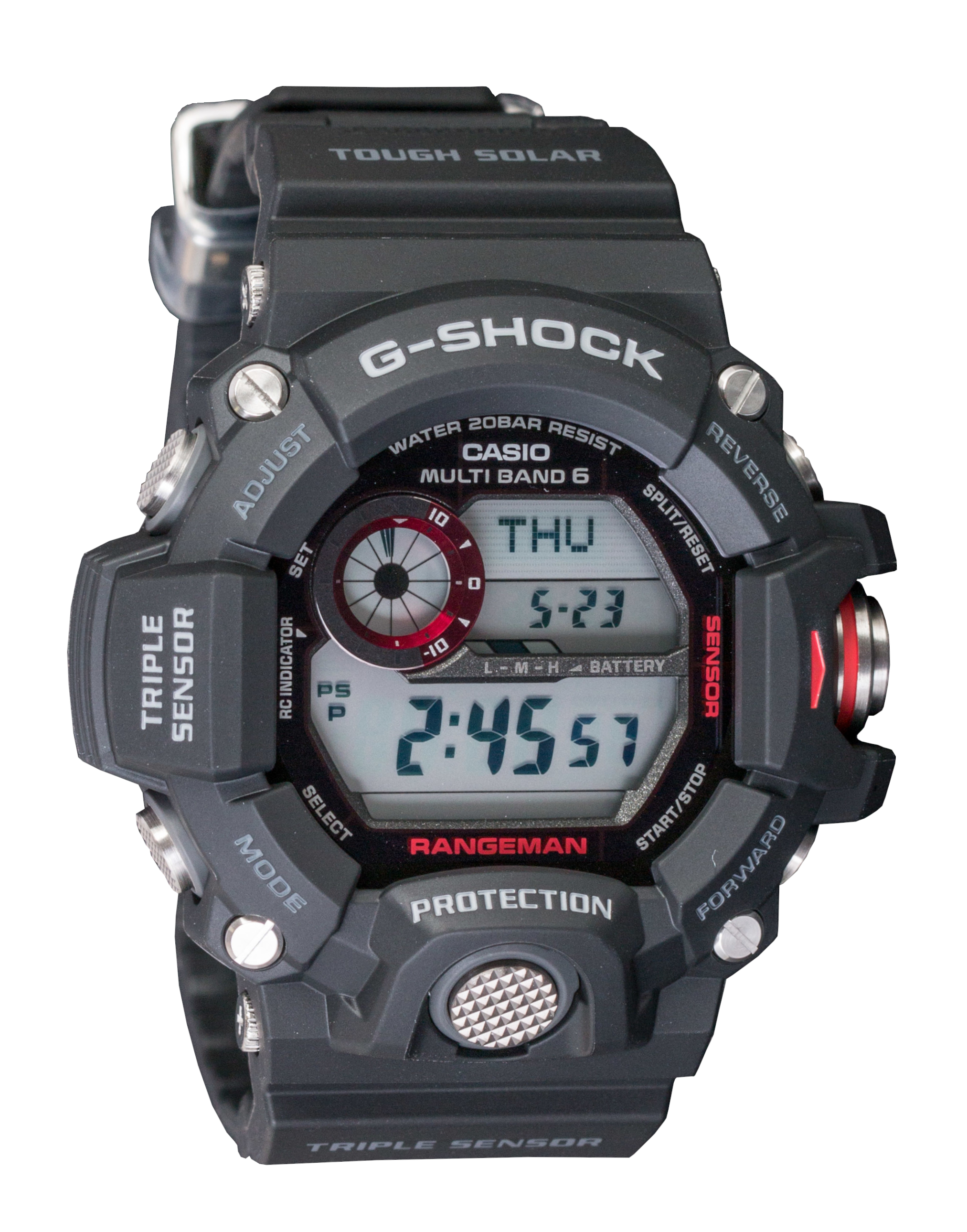
Rangeman GW-94001-ER

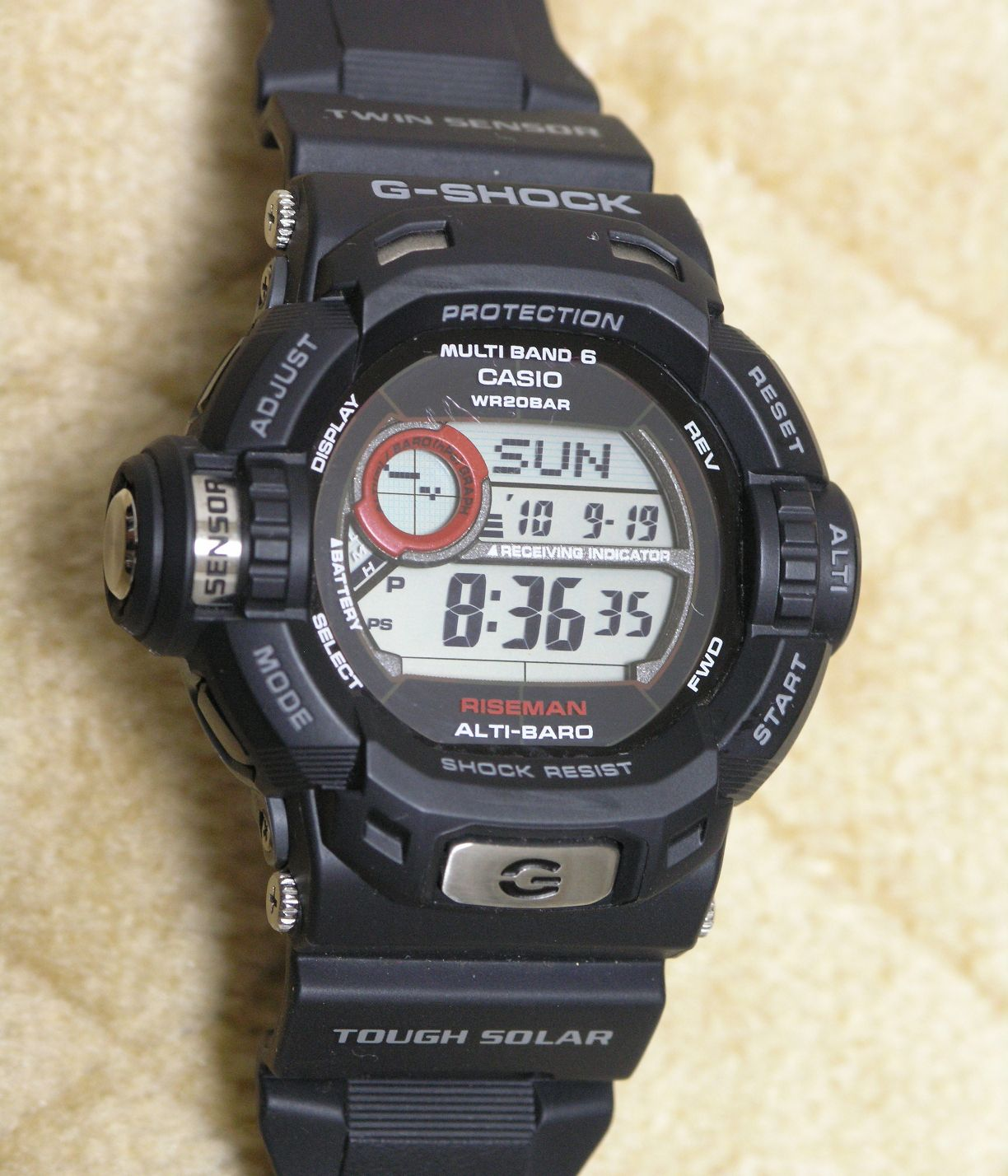
Riseman GW-9200J-1JF

== See also ==
- Casio
- G-Shock
