= Ōtakadoyayama Transmitter =

Coordinates: 37.367°N 140.850°E

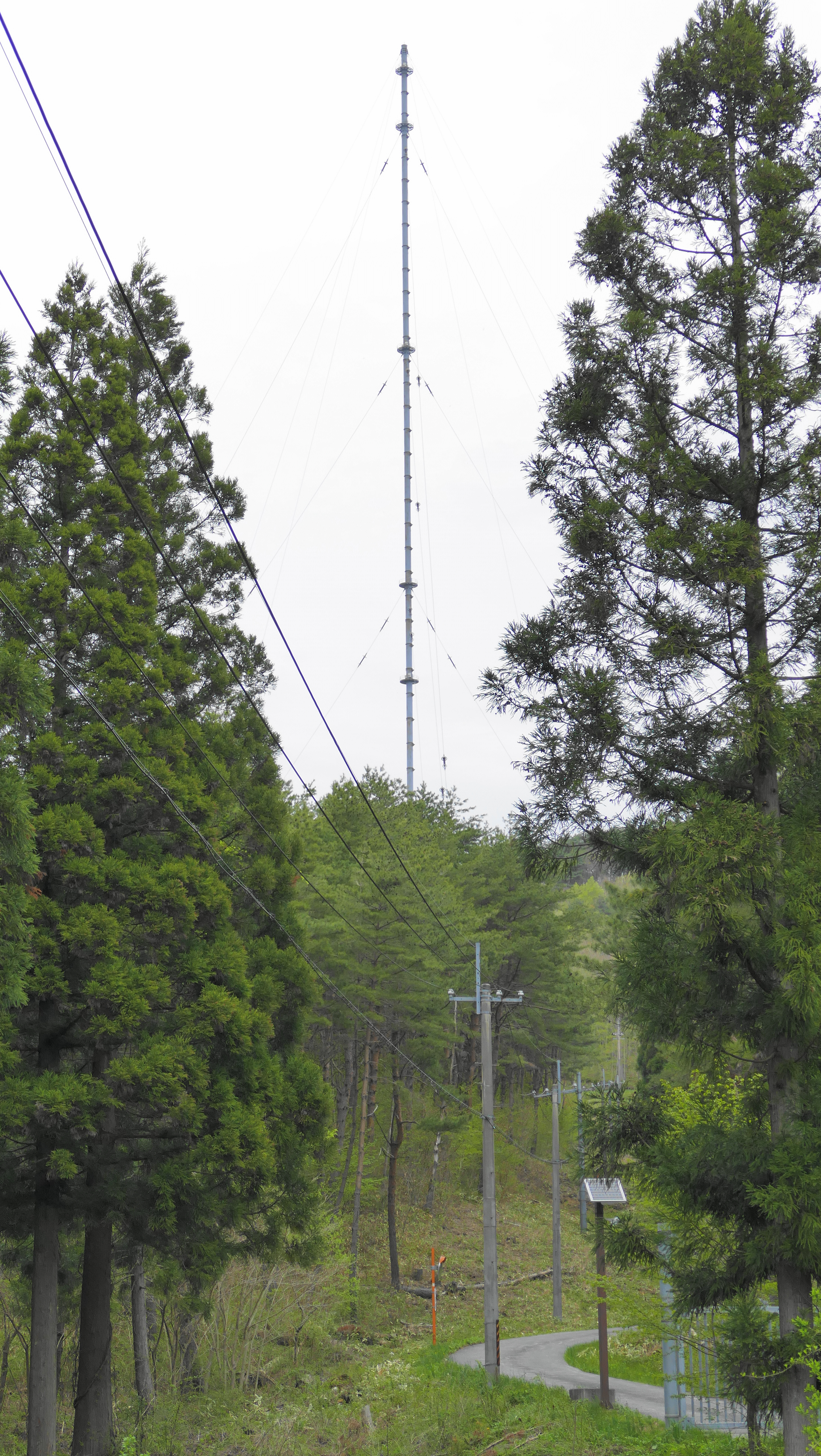
Antenna of Ōtakadoyayama Transmitter

Ōtakadoyayama Transmitter (おおたかどや山標準電波送信所, Ōtakadoyayama Hyōjun Denpa Sōshinjo) is an LF-time signal transmitter at Tamura-City, Fukushima-ken, Japan used for transmitting the time signal JJY on 40 kHz. The Otakadoyama site is one of two JJY transmitters, another is the Haganeyama site.

== Summary ==
- NAME：NICT Ōtakadoyayama LF station
- Location：Summit of Mt. Otakadoya, Tamura-City, Fukushima-ken
- Elevation：about 790m
- Latitude：37°22'21.0"N
- Longitude：140°50'56.0"E
- License：NICT
- Station purpose：Transmitting the official Japanese government frequency standards and time signal
- Frequency form：250H A1B
- Frequency：40kHz
- Antenna power：50kW（Antenna efficiency: about 45%）
- Antenna form：Umbrella type 250m high
- Operation time：continuously
- Operation start：1999/06/01
- Range：About 1,000 km
- Transmission method :

== See also ==
- Haganeyama Transmitter
