= Haganeyama Transmitter =

Coordinates: 33.4656°N 130.176°E

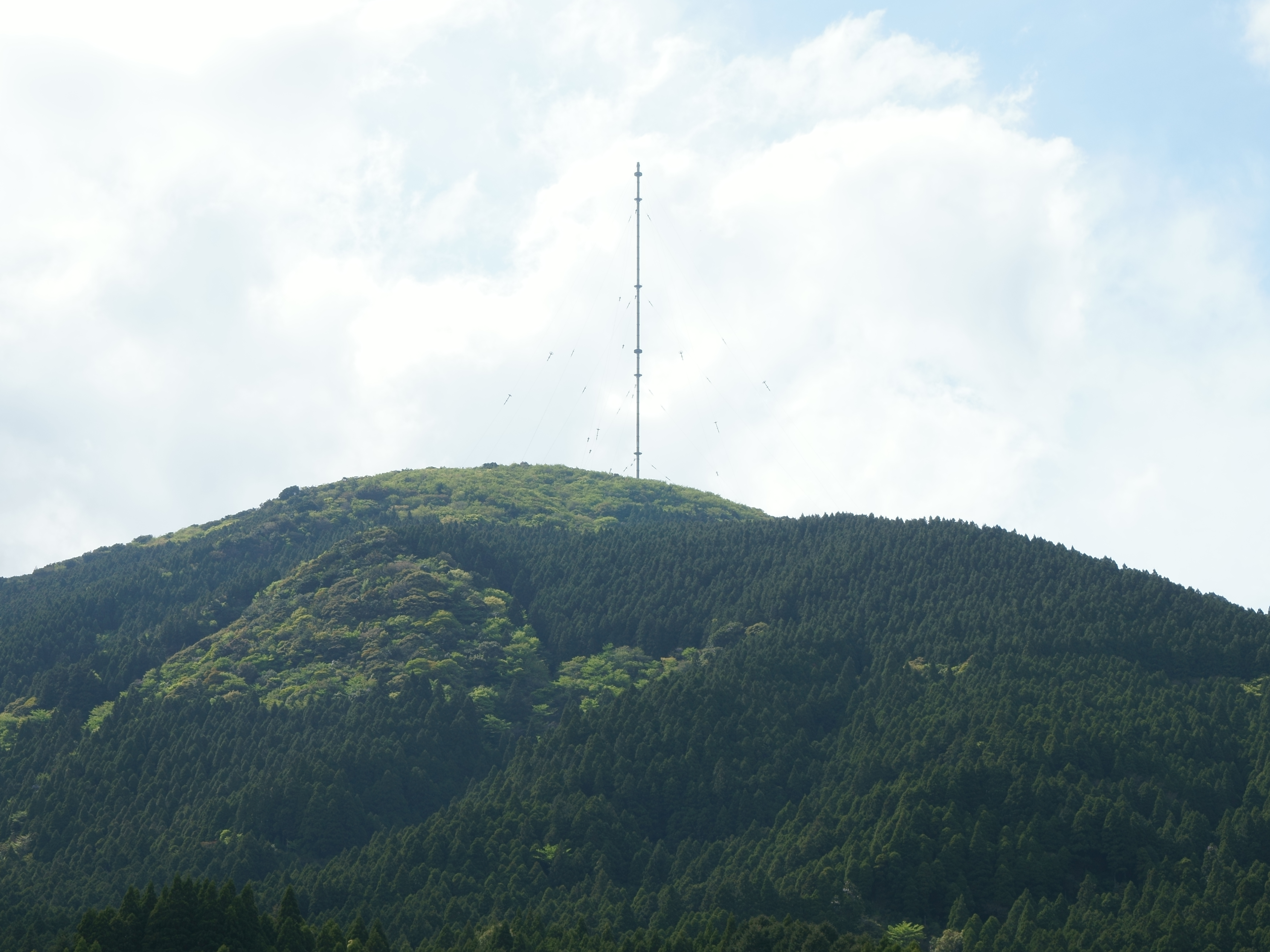
Antenna of Haganeyama Transmitter, view from southeast.

Haganeyama Transmitter (はがね山標準電波送信所, Haganeyama Hyōjun Denpa Sōshinjo) is an LF-time signal transmitter at Fuji-cho, Saga-city, Saga-ken, Japan used for transmitting the time signal JJY on 60 kHz. The Haganeyama site is one of two JJY transmitters, another is the Otakadoyama site.

== Summary ==
- NAME: NICT Haganeyama LF station
- Location: Summit of Mt. Hagane, Fuji-cho, Saga-city, Saga-ken
- Elevation: about 900m
- Latitude: 33°27'56.0"N
- Longitude: 130°10'32.0"E
- License: NICT
- Station purpose: Transmitting the official Japanese government frequency standards and time signal
- Frequency form: 250H A1B
- Frequency: 60kHz
- Antenna power: 50kW (Antenna efficiency: about 45%)
- Antenna form: Umbrella type 200m high
- Operation time: continuously
- Operation start: 2001/10/01
- Range: About 1,000 km
- Transmission method :

== See also ==
- Otakadoyayama Transmitter
