= BPC (time signal) =

Time signal radio station in China

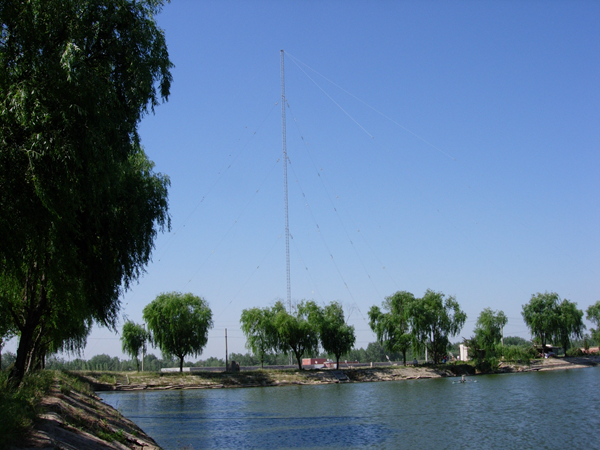
BPC Antenna

BPC is the callsign of a low-frequency time signal broadcast from the Shangqiu Time-Code Radio Station. Operating since April 1, 2002, the station was jointly established by the National Time Service Center (NTSC) of the Chinese Academy of Sciences and Xi'an Gaohua Technology Co., Ltd.

However, on February 16, 2021, the major cooperation agreement between the National Time Service Center (NTSC) and Xi'an Gaohua Technology Co., Ltd. expired, and the two parties did not renew the partnership. Since then, the NTSC has independently maintained the signal transmission.

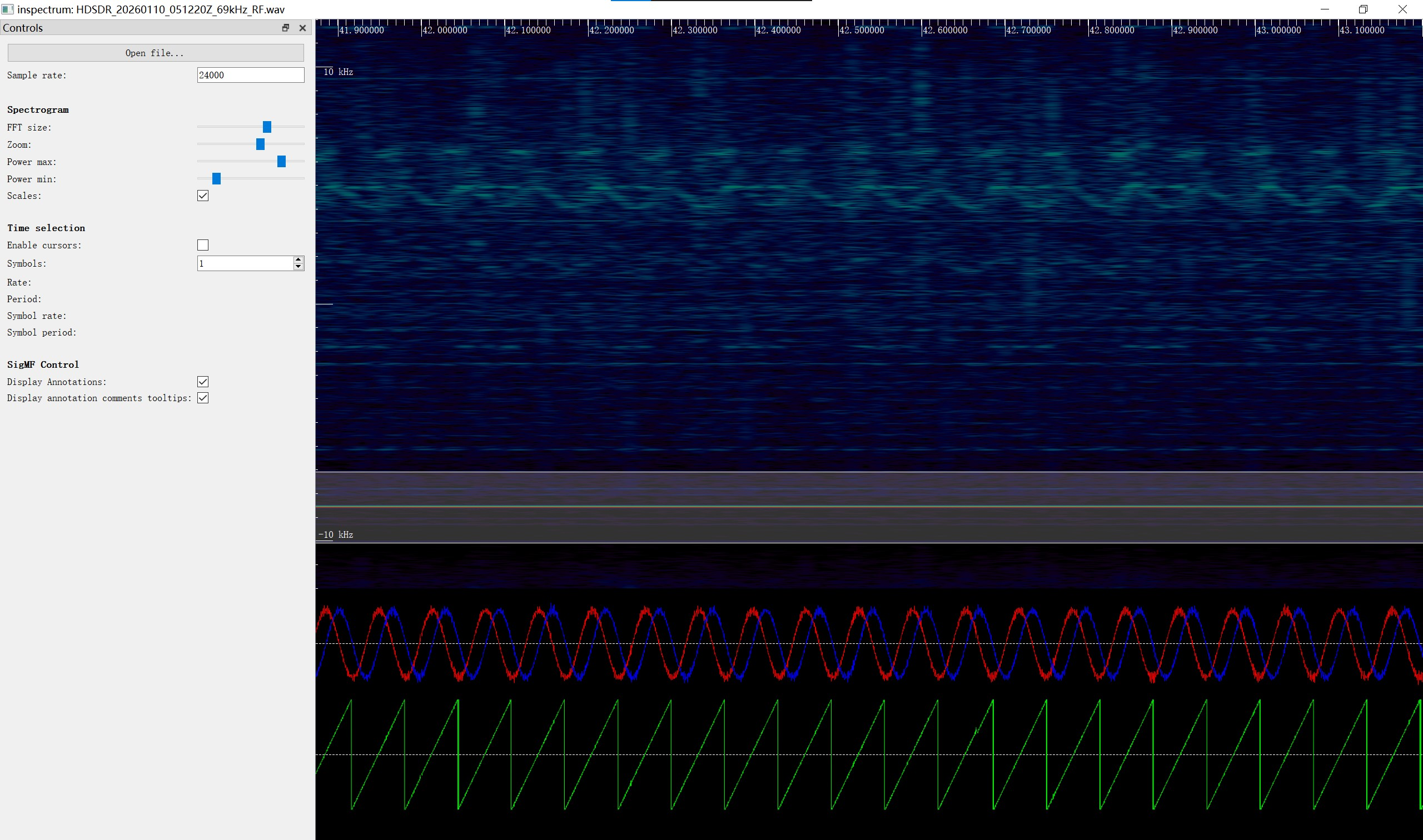
BPC time signal captured 2026-01-10 in Jinan. The sawtooth on the bottom is the recovered carrier phase, showing no phase modulation.

BPC transmits a time signal on 68.5 kHz, which can be used for synchronizing radio controlled clocks. The transmission site is situated near Shangqiu, Henan Province at 34.4565°N 115.8369°E.

BPC broadcasts at 90 kW for 20 hours per day, with a 4-hour break from 05:00–08:00 China Standard Time (21:00–00:00 UTC) daily. BPC transmits an amplitude-modulated time code during the first 400 ms of each second, and an unmodulated carrier during the last 600 ms. An additional phase-modulated spread-spectrum time code was proposed, but there is no evidence that it has been implemented.

The aging infrastructure periodically undergoes extended maintenance; for example, in June 2026, the NTSC announced a 45-day scheduled maintenance on the main antenna system, temporarily reducing daily broadcast hours.

== Time code ==
BPC transmits the time every 20 seconds, using an amplitude-modulated binary code sent at 2 bits per second. Each 20-second block encodes the China Standard Time of the beginning of that block.

To encode each pair of bits, the transmitter is reduced by 10 dB (to 10% of normal power) at the beginning of each second, and restored to full power after a multiple of 0.1 seconds. The duration of the reduction encodes the bits, as follows:

BPC bit coding Signal reduced at the beginning of each second
Duration	MSbit	LSbit
0 ms	Start of time code	
100 ms	0	0
200 ms	0	1
300 ms	1	0
400 ms	1	1

If there is no signal reduction at all, that is a special marker which marks the beginning of the time code.

10-Jan-2026, 16h34m39s - 16h35m21s, Received in Jinan, Shandong, China

BPC time code, sent every 20 seconds on the minute
Second	MSbit LSbit	Meaning	Second	MSbit LSbit	Meaning
00	—	Start of time code No signal gap	10	12; P1	Hour (0=AM 1=PM); Even parity over 01–09
01	40; 20	Second (00, 20 or 40)	11	0	Unused
01	40; 20	Second (00, 20 or 40)	11	16	Day of month (01–31)
02	0; 0	Unused	12	8; 4	Day of month (01–31)
03	8; 4	Hour (00–11)	13	2; 1	Day of month (01–31)
04	2; 1	Hour (00–11)	14	8; 4	Month (01–12)
05	32; 16	Minute (00–59)	15	2; 1	Month (01–12)
06	8; 4	Minute (00–59)	16	32; 16	Year (00–99)
07	2; 1	Minute (00–59)	17	8; 4	Year (00–99)
08	0	Unused	18	2; 1	Year (00–99)
08	4	Day of week 1=Monday; 7=Sunday	18	2; 1	Year (00–99)
09	2; 1	Day of week 1=Monday; 7=Sunday	19	64	Year (00–99)
09	2; 1	Day of week 1=Monday; 7=Sunday	19	P2	Even parity over 11–18

Note: The bits sent in the same second as the parity bits are not parity-checked.
