= JJY =

Japanese time signal radio station

JJY's transmitters are located at the Otakadoyayama Transmitter (right dot) in Tamura City, Fukushima Prefecture, and the Haganeyama Transmitter (left dot) in Saga City, Saga Prefecture.

JJY is the call sign of a low frequency time signal radio station located, in Japan.

The station broadcasts from two sites, one on Mount Otakadoya, near Fukushima, and the other on Mount Hagane, located on Kyushu island. JJY is operated by the National Institute of Information and Communications Technology (NICT), an independent administrative institution, affiliated with the Ministry of Internal Affairs and Communications, of the Japanese government.

== Transmission sites ==
The Mount Otakadoya site (37°22′21″N 140°50′56″E) is located at an elevation of 790 meters (2,590 ft) in Tamura City, Fukushima Prefecture. It broadcasts a 50 kW signal (13 kW ERP) on 40 kHz from an umbrella top-loading antenna situated 250 meters (820 ft) above the ground. In March 2011, it was powered down and evacuated due to its proximity to the Fukushima Daiichi nuclear disaster. It resumed broadcasting on April 21, unattended by staff. It went off air again temporarily on April 25 due to lightning, but has ever since been on air.

The Mount Hagane site (33°27′56″N 130°10′32″E) is located at an elevation of 900 meters (2,950 ft) in Saga City, Saga Prefecture. It broadcasts a 50 kW signal (23 kW ERP) on 60 kHz to avoid interfering with the Otakadoya site as their signals overlap. The antenna for the Hagane site is also an umbrella top loading antenna and is situated 200 meters (650 ft) above the ground. This site does not have a redundant 40 kHz transmitter, so cannot act as a fallback for the Mount Otakadoya site.

== Time standards ==
Both carrier signals contain an identical pulse-width modulated time code and are transmitted 24 hours a day. The transmissions are at low frequency (LF) to enhance accuracy and reduce the possibility of atmospheric interference. The calculated accuracy of JJY's signal is 1×10^{−11}.

Japan Standard Time is set by a caesium atomic clock in Tokyo. This information is sent to the transmitter stations and is used to set a caesium atomic clock at each station. These clocks are housed in an environmentally controlled and electromagnetically shielded room to prevent outside interference with the clocks.

The time code format is very similar to that of WWVB in the United States but technically is a variant of IRIG. Similarly to WWVB or MSF the signal of JJY is used to synchronize consumer radio-controlled clocks sold throughout Japan.

== Transmission systems ==
Each station has an identical setup of equipment. A dual set of transmitters, a primary and a backup, provide for constant transmission of the time code. However, it is not possible given the current design configuration for one site to act as a lower power alternate frequency backup for the other. The backups are set to automatically take over in the event that the primary transmission system has a failure. The Time Signal Control Room generates the standard LF signal and time code that is broadcast.

The Impedance Matching Room has a matching transformer to perform impedance matching between the transmitter and the antenna. Due to the high power of radio frequency signals that pass through the room, it is completely shielded in copper and is off-limits during broadcasts.

== History and former shortwave station ==
On January 30, 1940, the Communications Research Laboratory (the predecessor of NICT) began operating JJY as a shortwave station, broadcasting at 4, 7, 9, and 13 MHz. Over the years, the shortwave frequencies were lowered, and by the late 1950s, JJY was transmitting its time signal on standard frequencies of 2.5, 5, 8, 10, and 15 MHz. The 2.5 and 15 MHz broadcasts terminated in 1996. The time signals included announcements of the time, in Morse code and by a female voice, before every tenth minute: for example, "JJY JJY 1630 JST" (the voice announcement of the time being in Japanese).

Experimental station JG2AS began broadcasting on January 10, 1966, providing digitally encoded time signals in the longwave band at 40 kHz. In 1997, the CRL, determining that the longwave time signal was more accurate when received, subject to less interference, and in wider use than the shortwave time signal, decided to construct a new longwave time station and gradually eliminate the shortwave broadcasts. The first official longwave station of JJY began broadcasting from Mount Otakadoya at 40 kHz on June 10, 1999, and the shortwave broadcasts ceased operation on March 31, 2001. On October 1, 2001, the 60 kHz longwave transmission from Mount Hagane began.

The Mount Otakadoya transmitter survived the 2011 Tōhoku earthquake and tsunami, but is 17 km from the Fukushima I nuclear accidents, and was powered down when it was evacuated on March 12 (19:46 JST) due to the 20 km radius evacuation order. It was re-enabled April 21.

== JJY time code ==
As with most longwave time code stations, the JJY signal is amplitude-modulated to send one bit per second, transmitting a complete time code every minute.

The time code is most similar to that transmitted by WWVB, but each bit is reversed: on the second, the carrier is increased to full power. Some time during the second (depending on the bit to be transmitted), the carrier is reduced by 10 dB, to 10% power, until the beginning of the next second.

Recorded signal for 2016-08-03 15:45 JST. Note the Morse code call sign ("JJY JJY") transmitted from 0:40 to 0:49.

There are three different signals that are sent each second:

- 0 bits consist of 0.8 s of full power, followed by 0.2 s of reduced power.
- 1 bits consist of 0.5 s of full power, followed by 0.5 s of reduced power.
- Marker bits consist of 0.2 s of full power, followed by 0.8 s of reduced power.

As with WWVB, seconds 0, 9, 19, 29, 39, 49 and 59 of each minute are marker bits. The remaining 53 encode Japan Standard Time using binary-coded decimal. JST does not include summer time, but bits are reserved to handle it. Leap second warning bits are also provided, these announce leap seconds starting at the beginning of the UTC month (09:00 JST on the first day of the month), and ending with the leap second insertion (just after 08:59 JST on the first day of the following month).

The time code in full is as follows:

The first 35 seconds are identical to WWVB, but after that it diverges, including some parity and day-of-week bits not in WWVB, and omitting DUT1 information.

Bit (Second)	Weight	Meaning	Bit (Second)	Weight	Meaning	Bit (Second)	Weight	Meaning
:00	M	Start of minute marker bit	:20	0	Unused, always 0.	:40	SU2	Currently unused, always 0. (Future: summer time is in effect.)
:01	40	Minutes	:21	0	Unused, always 0.	:41	80	Year
:02	20	Minutes	:22	200	Day of year 1=January 1; 365=December 31; 366=December 31, leap year	:42	40	Year
:03	10	Minutes	:23	100	Day of year 1=January 1; 365=December 31; 366=December 31, leap year	:43	20	Year
:04	0	Minutes	:24	0	Day of year 1=January 1; 365=December 31; 366=December 31, leap year	:44	10	Year
:05	8	Minutes	:25	80	Day of year 1=January 1; 365=December 31; 366=December 31, leap year	:45	8	Year
:06	4	Minutes	:26	40	Day of year 1=January 1; 365=December 31; 366=December 31, leap year	:46	4	Year
:07	2	Minutes	:27	20	Day of year 1=January 1; 365=December 31; 366=December 31, leap year	:47	2	Year
:08	1	Minutes	:28	10	Day of year 1=January 1; 365=December 31; 366=December 31, leap year	:48	1	Year
:09	P1	Marker bit	:29	P3	Day of year 1=January 1; 365=December 31; 366=December 31, leap year	:49	P5	Marker bit
:10	0	Unused, always 0.	:30	8	Day of year 1=January 1; 365=December 31; 366=December 31, leap year	:50	4	Day of week. 0=Sunday, 6=Saturday
:11	0	Unused, always 0.	:31	4	Day of year 1=January 1; 365=December 31; 366=December 31, leap year	:51	2	Day of week. 0=Sunday, 6=Saturday
:12	20	Hours	:32	2	Day of year 1=January 1; 365=December 31; 366=December 31, leap year	:52	1	Day of week. 0=Sunday, 6=Saturday
:13	10	Hours	:33	1	Day of year 1=January 1; 365=December 31; 366=December 31, leap year	:53	LS1	Leap second at end of current UTC month.
:14	0	Hours	:34	0	Unused, always 0.	:54	LS2	Leap second type: 1=added, 0=deleted.
:15	8	Hours	:35	0	Unused, always 0.	:55	0	Unused, always 0.
:16	4	Hours	:36	PA1	Even parity of hours bits (:12–:18).	:56	0	Unused, always 0.
:17	2	Hours	:37	PA2	Even parity of minutes bits (:01–:08).	:57	0	Unused, always 0.
:18	1	Hours	:38	SU1	Currently unused, always 0. (Future: change to/from summer time within 6 days.)	:58	0	Unused, always 0.
:19	P2	Marker bit	:39	P4	Marker bit	:59	P0	Marker bit.

P0 is always the last second of a minute. In the event of a leap second, an additional 0 bit is inserted before it, and the marker bit is transmitted during second 60. LS1 and LS2 are normally both 0. Both bits are set to announce an inserted leap second at the end of the current UTC month.

Twice per hour (minutes 15 and 45), the last 20 seconds of the time code are different. In lieu of the year bits, the station's call sign is broadcast in Morse code twice using on-off keying during seconds 40 through 48. Further, bits 50 through 55 are replaced by 6 status bits ST1 through ST6 which, if non-zero, indicate a scheduled service interruption:

Bit (Second)	Weight	Meaning
:39	P4	Marker bit
:40–:48	Call sign announcement	
:49	P5	Marker bit
:50	ST1	Service interruption scheduled
:51	ST2	Service interruption scheduled
:52	ST3	Service interruption scheduled
:53	ST4	Service interruption daytime only
:54	ST5	Service interruption duration
:55	ST6	Service interruption duration
:56	0	Unused, always 0.
:57	0	Unused, always 0.
:58	0	Unused, always 0.
:59	P0	Marker bit.

ST1 through ST3 indicate the time of the planned service interruption:

ST1	ST2	ST3	Meaning
0	0	0	No service interruption planned within 7 days.
0	0	1	Service interruption planned within 7 days.
0	1	0	Service interruption planned within 3–6 days.
0	1	1	Service interruption planned within 2 days.
1	0	0	Service interruption planned within 24 hours.
1	0	1	Service interruption planned within 12 hours.
1	1	0	Service interruption planned within 2 hours.

ST4, if set, promises the service interruption will be during daylight hours only. If unset, the interruption may be all day.

ST5 and ST6 indicate the duration of the interruption:

ST5	ST6	Meaning
0	0	No service interruption planned.
0	1	Interruption for 7 days or more, or unknown duration.
1	0	Interruption for 2–6 days.
1	1	Interruption less than 2 days.

If no interruption is planned, all ST bits are 0.
