= National Institute of Information and Communications Technology =

Japanese research institute

Coordinates: 35°42′33.3″N 139°29′16″E

- 情報通信研究機構; Jōhō Tsūshin Kenkyū Kikō
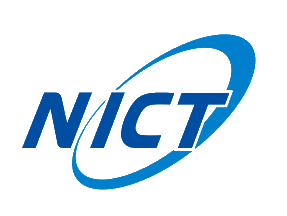

Agency overview
- Formed: October 1896
- Jurisdiction: Government of Japan
- Headquarters: Koganei, Tokyo, Japan
- Agency executive: Masao Sakauchi, President
- Parent agency: Ministry of Internal Affairs and Communications
- Website: www.nict.go.jp/en/index.html

The National Institute of Information and Communications Technology (情報通信研究機構, Jōhō Tsūshin Kenkyū Kikō; NICT) is Japan's primary national research institute for information and communications. It is located in Koganei, Tokyo, Japan.

NICT was established as an Independent Administrative Institution in 2004 when Japan's Communications Research Laboratory (established 1896) merged with the Telecommunications Advancement Organization. Today NICT's mission is to carry out research and development in the field of information and communications technology. It has a range of responsibilities including generating and disseminating Japan's national frequency and time standards; conducting type approval tests of radio equipment for the Global Maritime Distress Safety System (GMDSS) and marine radar based on Japan's Radio Law; and providing regular observations of the ionosphere and space weather. It also operates the JJY, a low frequency time signal.

In late August 2015, it was announced that a terahertz radiation scanner developed by the institute would be one of the instruments carried by the ESA's Jupiter Icy Moons Explorer, currently due for launch in 2022.

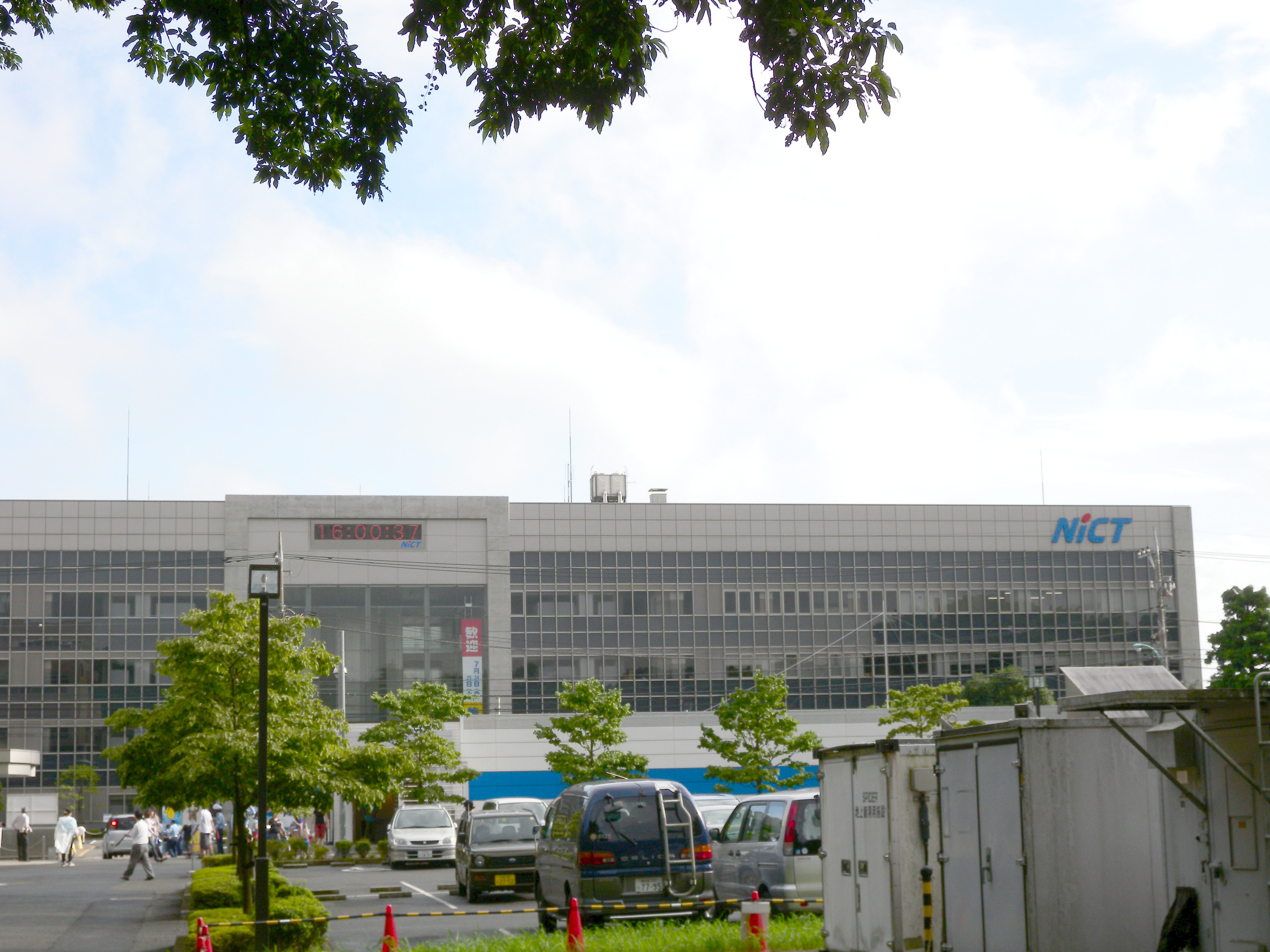
NICT building in Koganei, Tokyo

== See also ==
- Independent Administrative Institution
- List of Independent Administrative Institutes in Japan
