= ALS162 time signal =

French longwave time signal radio station

TDF ALS162 time code transmitter
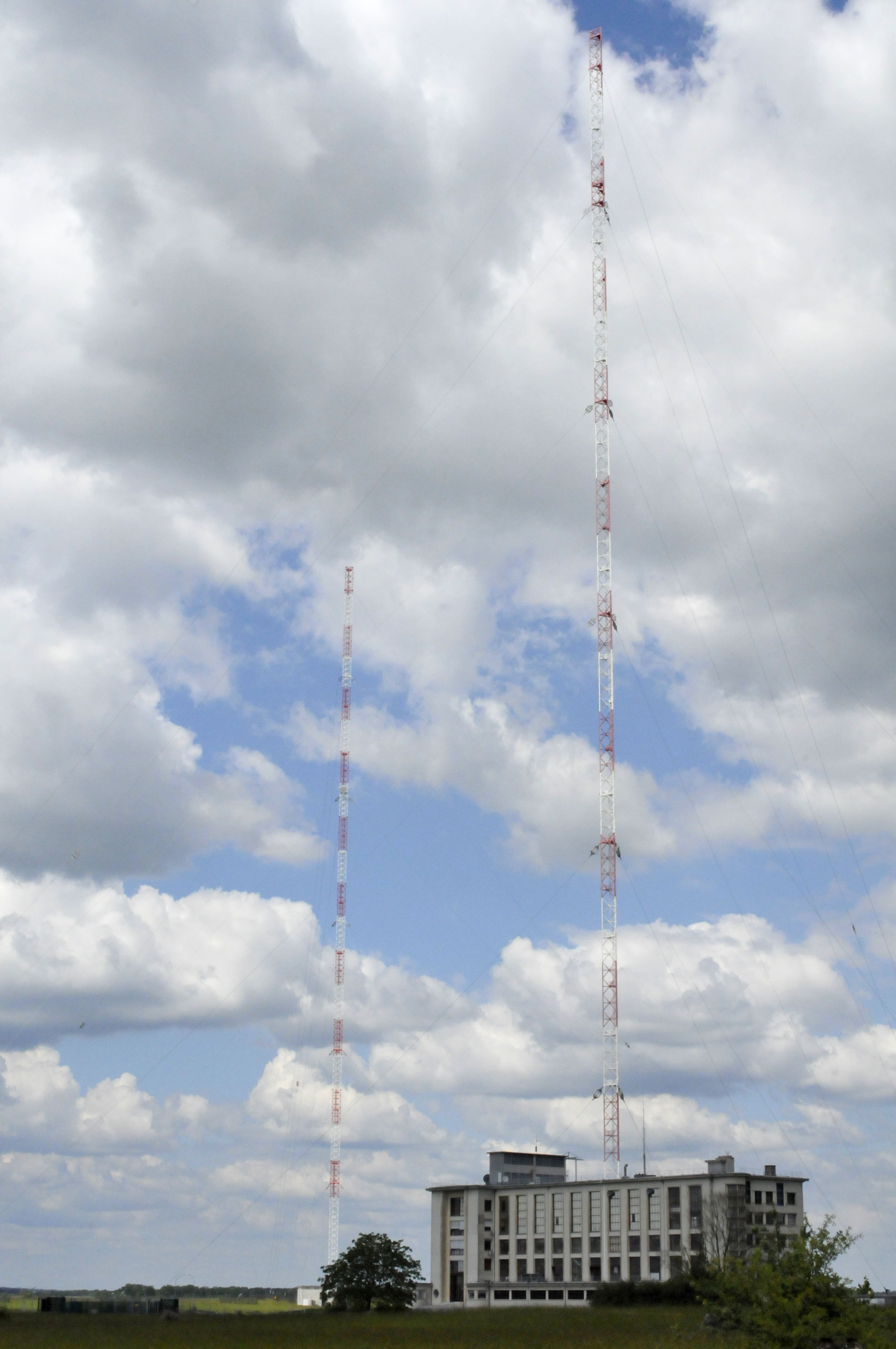
- The 350 m tall low frequency antennas of ALS162 time signal in Allouis
- Location: Allouis longwave transmitter, Allouis, France
- Coordinates: 47.1695°N 2.2046°E
- Elevation: 129 m (423 ft)
- Operator: TéléDiffusion de France on behalf of the ANFR and LNE–SYRTE
- Frequency: 162 kHz
- Power: 800 kW
- Began operation: July 1980
- Official range: 3,500 km (2,175 mi)

ALS162 is a French longwave time signal and standard-frequency radio station and is used for the dissemination of the Metropolitan French national legal time to the public. TéléDiffusion de France broadcast the ALS162 time signal, provided by LNE-SYRTE and LNE-LTFB time laboratories under ANFR (state body for radio frequencies) responsibility, from the Allouis longwave transmitter at 162 kHz, with a power of 800 kW.

The current time signal is generated by extremely accurate caesium atomic clocks and phase-modulated on the 162 kHz (1850.5707284 m wavelength) carrier signal in a way that is inaudible when listening to the signal using normal Longwave receivers. The ALS162 phase-modulated time signal service requires a more complex receiver than the popular German DCF77 amplitude-modulated time signal service, but the much more powerful transmitter (16 times DCF77's 50 kW) gives it a much greater range of 3,500 km.

The signal transmission is almost continuous, but there is a regularly scheduled interruption for maintenance and tests every Tuesday from 08:00 to 12:00.

The transmitter building contains two caesium atomic clocks which are used to generate the time signal and which are monitored through the SYREF system and GPS common-view measurements, to align with the official French UTC(OP) time scale. The ALS162 time signal exactitude should be in excess of 1 millisecond uncertainty. The monitoring of the ALS162 signal is jointly conducted by LNE-SYRTE, LNE-LTFB and the trade body France Horlogerie and measurement results are published in real time. Monthly monitoring bulletins, like H 649 of the ALS162 signal regarding January 2022 measurements, show if the exactitude goals were met. The time signal is critical for over 300,000 devices (clocks in public places, information panels, traffic lights, public lighting, parking meters, etc.) deployed within French enterprises and state entities, such as French Railways (SNCF), electricity distributor Enedis, airports, hospitals, municipalities, etc. which depend on the signal in France and abroad.

== History ==
=== Call sign ===
The transmitter was previously known as TDF, FI or France Inter because the signal was formerly best known for radio broadcasting the France Inter AM signal. The transmission of audio (sound) signal ceased at the end of 2016, but the Allouis transmitter remains in use for the dissemination of the time signal and other digital signals. As of 2017 the transmitter has been renamed to ALS162. The call sign ALS162 stands for ALS = Allouis transmitter, 162 = frequency: 162 kHz.

=== Technical evolution ===
In 1977, the current phase-modulated time signal was added to the transmissions. The broadcast frequency, formerly 164 kHz, was changed to 163.840 kHz (the 5th harmonic of the common 32,768 Hz timekeeping frequency used by most quartz clocks) to be a more convenient frequency standard.

In 1980, the first atomic clock was installed to regulate the carrier frequency.

On 1 February 1986, the frequency was changed to its current value of 162 kHz (still an accurately controlled frequency standard) to bring it to a multiple of 9 kHz in accordance with the Geneva Frequency Plan of 1975.

Before 2017 the period used for scheduled signal interruptions for maintenance and tests was on Tuesday from 01:03 to 05:00.

=== Power output ===
The signal was formerly 1,000 kW and increased to 2,000 kW in 1981, but has been reduced to 1,500 kW in 2011, 1,100 kW in 2017 and subsequently to 800 kW in February 2020 for cost savings.

== Signal format ==
TéléDiffusion de France (TDF) uses an amplitude modulated longwave transmitter station. Time signals are transmitted by phase-modulating the carrier by ±1 radian in 0.1 s every second except the 59th second of each minute. This modulation pattern is repeated to indicate a binary one.

The binary encoding of date and time data during seconds 15 through 18 and 20 through 59 is identical to that of DCF77; the numbers of the minute, hour, day of the month, day of the week, month and year are transmitted each minute from the 21st to the 58th second, in accordance with the French legal time scale. The time transmitted is the local time of the upcoming minute.

Also like DCF77, bit 20 is always 1, bit 18 indicates that local time is UTC+1 (CET), bit 17 indicates that local time is UTC+2 (CEST), and bit 16 indicates that a change to local time will take place at the end of the current hour. Bit 15 is reserved to indicate abnormal transmitter operation.

As extensions to the DCF77 code, bit 14 is set during public holidays (14 July, Christmas, etc.), and bit 13 is set the day before public holidays.

Bits 7–12 are unused and always transmitted as 0.

Bits 3 through 6 provide additional error checking; they encode the total number of bits set (the Hamming weight of) bits 21 through 58. Because this includes the even parity bits, the sum is always even. Also, although there are 38 bits in that range, they may not all be set. The possible values are even numbers from 4 (on Tuesday 2000-01-04 at 00:00) through 24 (on Sunday 2177-07-27 at 17:37).

Unlike DCF77, bit 19 is not used for leap second warnings, but is always zero. Instead, bit 1 is used to warn of a positive leap second at the end of the current hour, and bit 2 is used to warn of a (very unlikely) negative leap second. In case of a leap second, an additional zero bit is inserted between bits 2 and 3. This is supposed to be inserted at 23:59:03, during minute 59 of the hour (during which the timestamp for minute :00 is transmitted), so that the minute markers are all broadcast at the correct times, but for the leap second at the end of December 2016, it was apparently inserted at 23:58:03.

The ALS162 transmitted carrier frequency relative uncertainty is 2 × 10^{−12} over a 24-hour period and 1 × 10^{−13} over 30 days.

ALS162 time code
Bit	Weight	Meaning	Bit	Weight	Meaning	Bit	Weight	Meaning
:00	M	Start of minute, always 0.	:20	S	Start of encoded time, always 1.	:40	10	Day of month (continued)
:01	A2	Positive leap second warning, set during previous hour	:21	1	Minutes; 00–59	:41	20	Day of month (continued)
:02	A3	Negative leap second warning, set during previous hour	:22	2	Minutes; 00–59	:42	1	Day of week Monday=1, Sunday=7
:03	2	Hamming weight (number of 1 bits) of bits 21–58 (always even)	:23	4	Minutes; 00–59	:43	2	Day of week Monday=1, Sunday=7
:04	4	Hamming weight (number of 1 bits) of bits 21–58 (always even)	:24	8	Minutes; 00–59	:44	4	Day of week Monday=1, Sunday=7
:05	8	Hamming weight (number of 1 bits) of bits 21–58 (always even)	:25	10	Minutes; 00–59	:45	1	Month number 01–12
:06	16	Hamming weight (number of 1 bits) of bits 21–58 (always even)	:26	20	Minutes; 00–59	:46	2	Month number 01–12
:07	0	Unused, always 0	:27	40	Minutes; 00–59	:47	4	Month number 01–12
:08	0	Unused, always 0	:28	P1	Even parity over minute bits 21–28.	:48	8	Month number 01–12
:09	0	Unused, always 0	:29	1	Hours; 0–23	:49	10	Month number 01–12
:10	0	Unused, always 0	:30	2	Hours; 0–23	:50	1	Year within century 00–99
:11	0	Unused, always 0	:31	4	Hours; 0–23	:51	2	Year within century 00–99
:12	0	Unused, always 0	:32	8	Hours; 0–23	:52	4	Year within century 00–99
:13	F1	Following day is a public holiday.	:33	10	Hours; 0–23	:53	8	Year within century 00–99
:14	F2	Current day is a public holiday.	:34	20	Hours; 0–23	:54	10	Year within century 00–99
:15	0	To be ignored.	:35	P2	Even parity over hour bits 29–35.	:55	20	Year within century 00–99
:16	A1	Summer time announcement. Set during hour before change.	:36	1	Day of month. 01–31	:56	40	Year within century 00–99
:17	Z1	Set to 1 when CEST is in effect.	:37	2	Day of month. 01–31	:57	80	Year within century 00–99
:18	Z2	Set to 1 when CET is in effect.	:38	4	Day of month. 01–31	:58	P3	Even parity over date bits 36–58.
:19	0	Unused, always 0	:39	8	Day of month. 01–31	:59	No bit transmitted during last second of each minute.	

== Phase modulation pattern ==
One signal element consists of the phase of the carrier shifted linearly by +1 rad in 25 ms (known as "ramp A"), then shifted linearly by −2 rad over 50 ms ("ramp B"), then shifted linearly again by +1 rad for another 25 ms ("ramp C"), returning the phase to zero. One signal element is always sent at each second between 0 and 58. Two signal elements are sent in sequence to represent a binary one; otherwise it is interpreted as binary zero. During ramp B of the initial signal element, the exact point the signal phase is at zero represents the top of the UTC second. Since the phase is the integral of the frequency, this triangular phase modulation at 40 rad/s corresponds to a square frequency modulation with a deviation of 20/π ≈ 6.37 Hz.

Both the average phase and the average frequency deviation are thus zero. Additional non-timing data is sent by phase modulation during the rest of each second. But the second marker (and data bit) is always preceded by 100 ms without any phase modulation. The signal is not phase-modulated at all during the 59th second past the minute.

== See also ==
- Loop antenna
- Allouis longwave transmitter, the facility used for its transmission.
- TéléDiffusion de France (also known as the TDF Group)

== Sources ==
- Betke, Klaus (2006-07-01). "Standard Frequency and Time Signal Stations On Longwave and Shortwave" (PDF). pp. 9–10. Archived from the original (PDF) on 2006-08-18.
- David L. Mills, Information on Time and Frequency — Time and Standard Frequency Station TDF (France)
- (in German) Funkuhren—Vergleich DCF77 mit TDF ("Clocks—Compare DCF77 with TDF") Includes a map showing the different reception ranges.
- (in French) http://pagesperso-orange.fr/tvignaud/am/allouis/allouis-heure.htm
- (in French) Signaux Horaires Description of the TDF signal and a working receiver.
- de Boer, Pieter-Tjerk (31 December 2017). "Radio-controlled clock at the Lille Flandres railway station". An example (with video) of the TDF time signal being received.
