= Mainhausen =

- Municipality
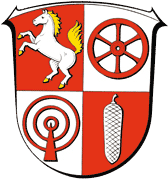
- Coat of arms

- Location of Mainhausen within Offenbach district
- Interactive map of Mainhausen
- Location within Germany Location within Hesse
- Coordinates: 50°01′N 9°0′E
- Country: Germany
- State: Hesse
- Admin. region: Darmstadt
- District: Offenbach

Government
  - Mayor (2020–26): Frank Simon (SPD)

Area
  - Total: 17.92 km^{2} (6.92 sq mi)
- Elevation: 110 m (360 ft)

Population (2025-12-31)
  - Total: 9,516
  - Density: 531.0/km^{2} (1,375/sq mi)
- Time zone: UTC+01:00 (CET)
  - Summer (DST): UTC+02:00 (CEST)
- Postal codes: 63533
- Dialling codes: 06182
- Vehicle registration: OF
- Website: www.mainhausen.de

Mainhausen (German pronunciation: [maɪnˈhaʊzn̩]) is a municipality of over 9,000 in the Offenbach district in the Regierungsbezirk of Darmstadt in Hesse, Germany.

== Geography ==
=== Location ===
Mainhausen is one of 13 towns and communities in the Offenbach district, lying in the southernmost part of Hesse right on the boundary with Bavaria. The community lies on the eastern edge of the Frankfurt Rhine Main Region right on the Main and southeast of the Frankfurt am Main metropolis.

=== Municipal area’s extent ===
The municipal area covers 17.92 km^{2} (6.92 sq mi).

=== Neighbouring communities ===
Mainhausen borders in the west and north on the town of Seligenstadt, in the east on the communities of Karlstein, Kleinostheim and Stockstadt am Main (all three in Aschaffenburg district) and in the south on the town of Babenhausen (Darmstadt-Dieburg).

=== Constituent communities ===
Mainhausen’s two Ortsteile are Mainflingen and Zellhausen; it is the smallest community in the Offenbach district. It came into being in 1977 through the merger of the two current member centres.

== History ==
In the Middle Ages, near Mainflingen, stood Hausen (Husen), which in 1357 was mentioned as an Imperial knightly fief from Hanau. The Häuser Schloss is an old tower hill from the 10th or 11th century whose builders are unknown.

=== Mainflingen ===
Mainflingen was known in mediaeval documents as Manolfingen, after the founder Manolf (a Germanic given name). The placename ending —ingen is a sign that the place was founded during the Migration Period (Völkerwanderung).

From the time between 775 and 799, various donations of landholdings to the Lorsch Abbey are recorded in the Manolfinger marca (a communally owned cadastral area). The place then belonged to the Frankish Maingau.

From the Middle Ages through to Secularization in 1803, Mainflingen belonged to the Electorate of Mainz, whereafter the place became Hessian.

Over on the other side of the Main near Dettingen, the French were defeated by an Austrian-Hanoverian-British army in the Battle of Dettingen in the War of the Austrian Succession.

=== Zellhausen ===
In the 7th century, the outlying Zellkirche (“Cell Church”, albeit not in the modern meaning; “cell” here means “outlying monastic community”), which was consecrated to Saint George, is believed to have been an Irish-Scottish-run mission. The fortifications around the church are thought to have been forsaken in the 13th century. The church itself stood until 1816.

==== The Häuser Schlösschen and the Zellerhof ====
These long-vanished settlements lay near each other. Both names take the definite article (in German: das Häuser Schlösschen; der Zellerhof). Both these places are believed to have burnt down in the Middle Ages. According to legend, the dwellers of the Zellerhof and those from the Häuser Schlösschen built a new settlement, naming it after the old villages, which yielded the name Zellhausen, which had its first documentary mention as Cellhusen in 1238. Digs carried out in 1829 unearthed foundations and cobblestones. They could have had something to do with a fortified tower with surrounding buildings.

About the time of Zellhausen’s first documentary mention, the Seligenstadt Monastery owned two estates here.

In 1791, the community bought its way out of serfdom by paying the landlords, who were the Archbishop and Electors of Mainz, 250 Gulden.

After Secularization in 1803, Zellhausen passed from Electoral Mainz to Hesse. In air raids on the Zellhausen airfield in 1944, there was heavy damage in the community itself.

== Politics ==
=== Community council ===
The municipal election held on 26 March 2006 yielded the following results:

| Parties and voter communities | | % 2006 | Seats; 2006 | % 2001 | Seats; 2001 |
| SPD | Social Democratic Party of Germany | 45.4 | 14 | 40.8 | 13 |
| CDU | Christian Democratic Union of Germany | 37.5 | 12 | 56.0 | 17 |
| FDP | Free Democratic Party | 11.4 | 3 | 3.1 | 1 |
| UWG | Unabhängige Wählergemeinschaft Mainhausen | 5.7 | 2 | – | – |
| Total | | 100.0 | 31 | 100.0 | 31 |
| Voter turnout in % | | 47.5 | | 58.2 | |

=== Mayor ===
- 2003–2020: Ruth Disser (SPD)
- 2020–incumbent: Frank Simon (SPD)

=== Town partnerships ===
- Pöls, Styria, Austria
- (Germany) Schwerstedt, Thuringia

== Economy and infrastructure ==
=== Transport ===
The Odenwaldbahn (railway) makes a stop in Mainhausen’s centre of Zellhausen on the way towards Hanau, Frankfurt and Groß-Umstadt-Wiebelsbach (with connections to Erbach and Eberbach).

=== Transmission facilities ===
Mainhausen is also home to major transmission facilities broadcasting in both the medium wave and longwave bands.

== Famous people ==
=== Sons and daughters of the town ===
- Käthe Paulus (1868–1935), first German professional woman balloonist, aerial acrobat and inventor of the foldable parachute
