= Mainflingen longwave transmitter =

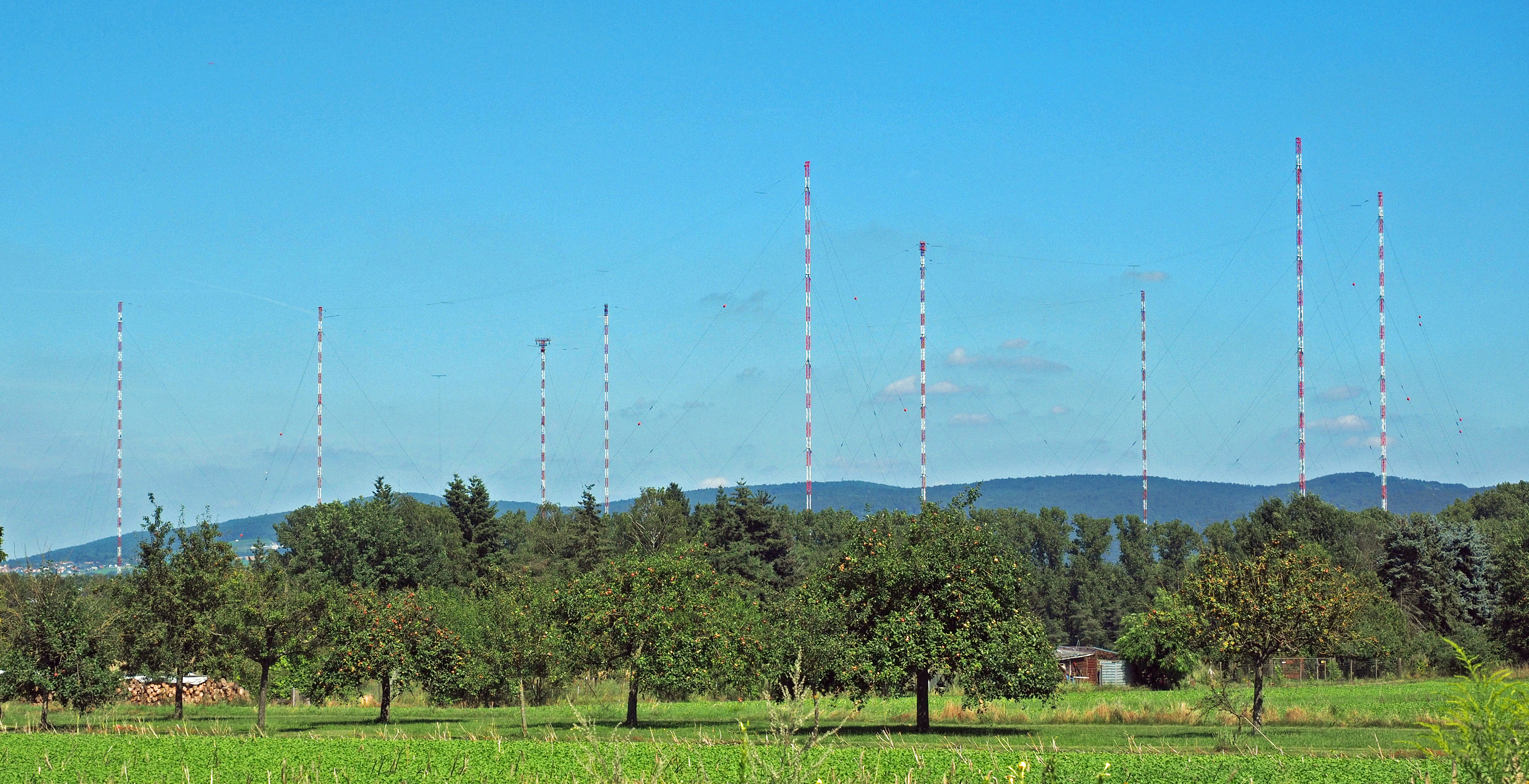
Mainflingen longwave transmitter

Mainflingen longwave transmitter is a large facility for commercial longwave transmissions at Mainflingen, Hesse, Germany, which was built in 1956. It uses several T- and triangle antennas, which are mounted on guyed masts of lattice steel, insulated against ground. The used masts have heights between 150 metres and 200 metres.

Southeast of the main antenna area, which is completely fenced in, but still north of the motorway A3 there is a further T-antenna, which is mounted on two guyed masts of lattice steel insulated against ground. Further there is a tower built of prefabricated concrete segments for mobile phone services close to the transmitter building.

All transmitters using the facility have a call sign starting with DCF. The best known of them is DCF77 longwave time signal and standard-frequency radio station. In earlier times the facility was also used for longwave broadcasting, especially as backup transmitter for Sender Donebach.

== See also ==
- Mainflingen mediumwave transmitter
- List of famous transmission sites
