= Allouis longwave transmitter =

French longwave broadcast transmitter

Coordinates: 47°10′10.5″N 2°12′16.5″E

The Allouis longwave transmitter has been France's central longwave broadcast transmitter since 1939. It is located near the village of Allouis.

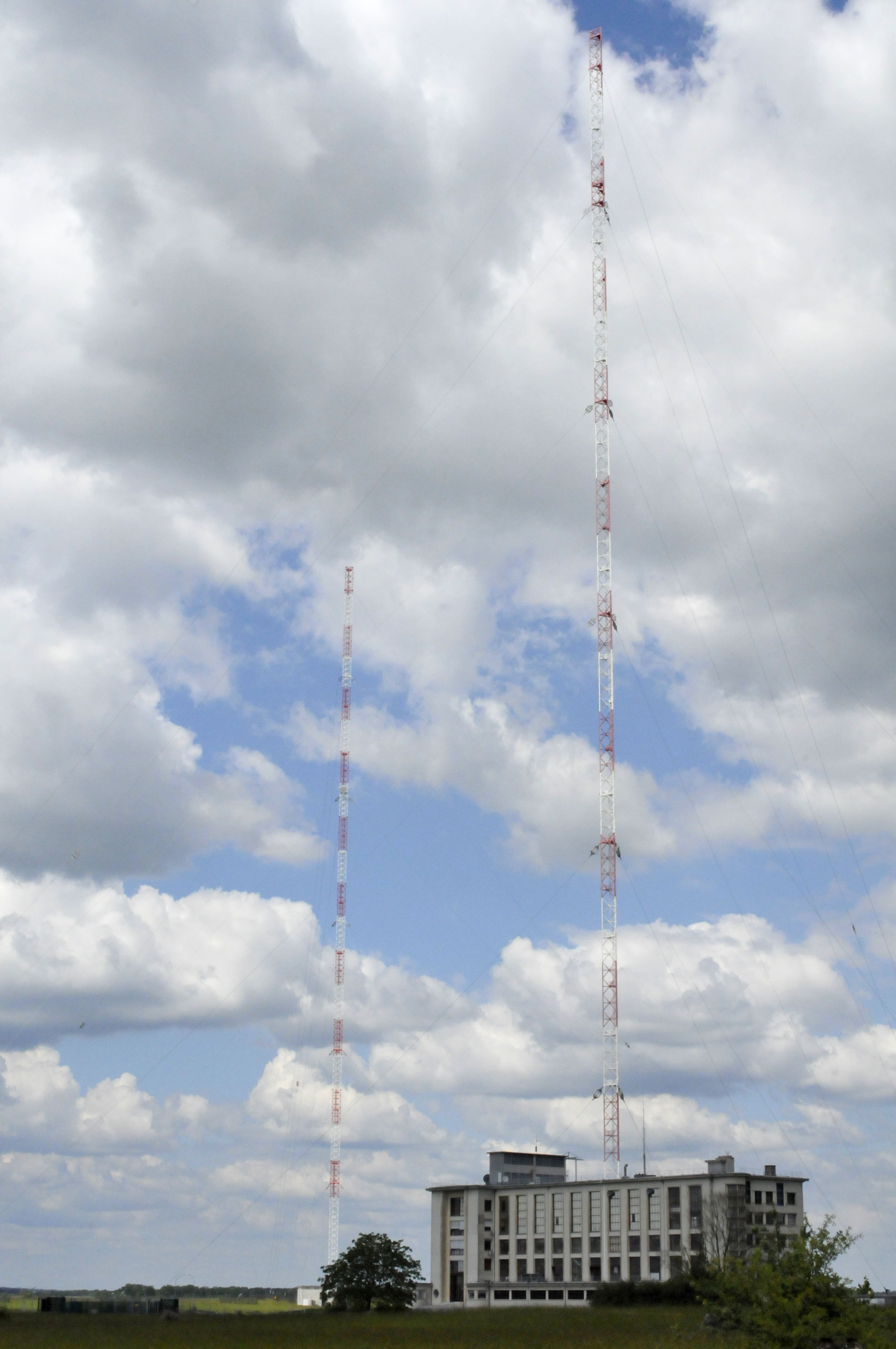
Allouis transmitter

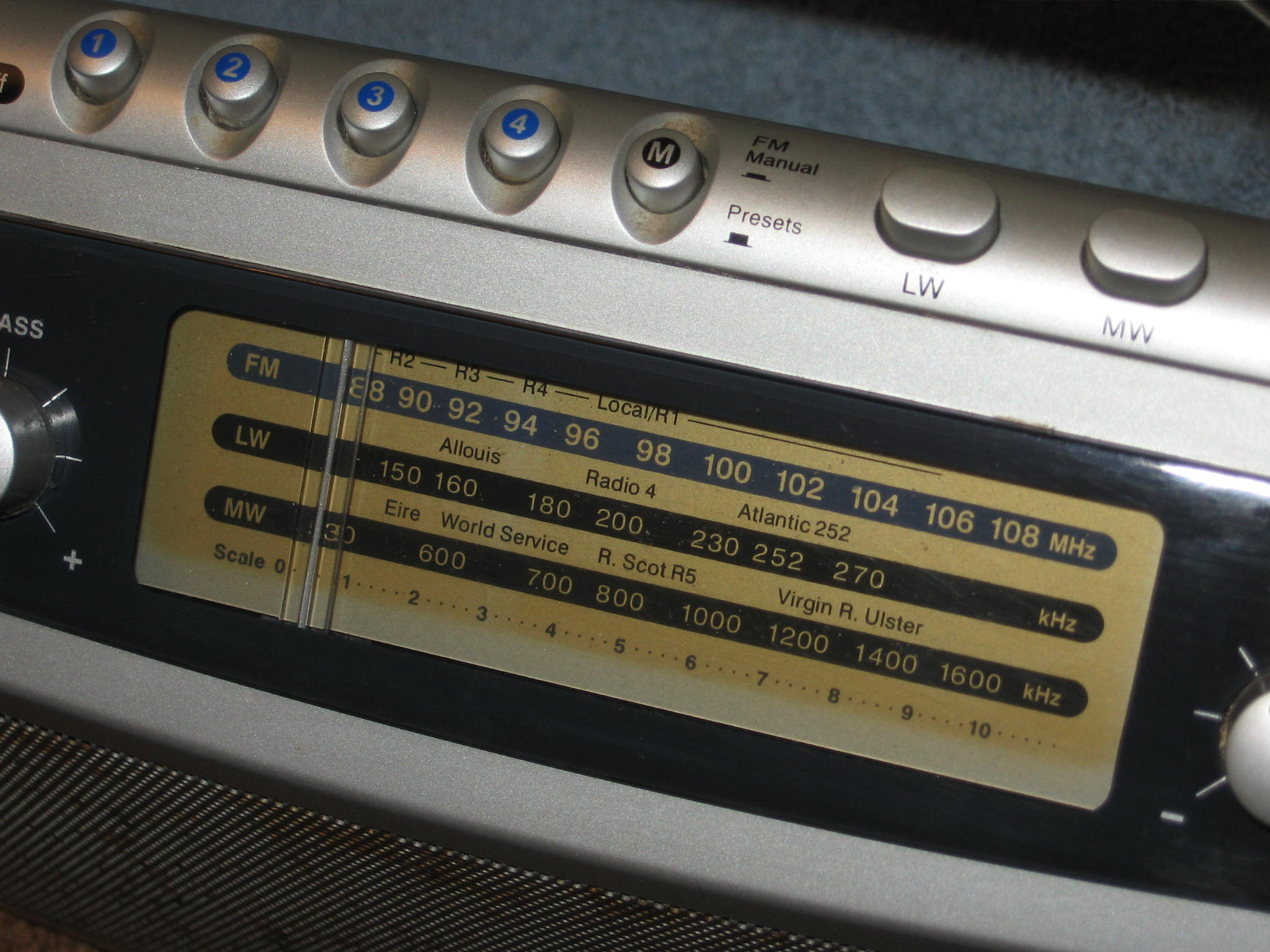
Tuning dial on portable radio including markings for Allouis transmitter frequency. (Roberts model purchased in UK circa early-to-mid 2000s.)

It broadcast the France Inter public radio station from October 1952 until 31 December 2016. Since 2017, it broadcasts only the TDF time signal, which has been renamed ALS162 since 2017.

== History ==
The first transmitter, built in 1939 during the Phoney War, used an aerial with four masts and a transmitter rated at 500 kilowatts. It was destroyed in 1944 during the scorched earth retreat by German forces.

On 19 October 1952 a new 250 kW transmitter came into service. This used a special cage aerial, mounted on a 308 m (1,010 ft) high earthed mast. In 1957 the transmission power was increased to 600 kW, in 1974 to 1,000 kW, and in 1981 to 2,000 kW. Transmission power was reduced to 1,000 kW during the hours of darkness. In 2011 the transmission power was reduced to 1,500 kW for cost savings. For the same reason the transmission power was reduced to 1,100 kW in 2017 and subsequently in February 2020 to 800 kW. In 2024, tests were performed at a reduced transmission power of 675 kW.

=== Technical alterations ===
In 1974 the aerial was renewed. The cage aerials were removed and the mast height was increased to 350 m (1,148 ft). A second mast of the same height was constructed at the same time.

In 1977, the current phase modulated time signal was added to the transmissions. The broadcast frequency, formerly 164 kHz, was changed to 163.840 kHz (the 5th harmonic of the common 32,768 Hz timekeeping frequency used by most quartz clocks) to be a more convenient frequency standard.

In 1980, the first atomic clock was installed to regulate the carrier frequency.

On 1 February 1986, the frequency was changed to its current value of 162 kHz (still an accurately controlled frequency standard) to bring it to a multiple of 9 kHz in accordance with the Geneva Frequency Plan of 1975.

The radio channel France Inter announced during 2016 that the channel would discontinue transmitting on the 162 kHz frequency on 31 December 2016, seeking cost savings of approximately 6 million Euros per year. The transmission of the ALS162 time signal was and will be continued after this date, as this time signal is critical for over 300,000 devices, which are deployed within French enterprises and state entities, like the French railways SNCF, the electricity distributor ENEDIS, airports, hospitals, municipalities, et cetera.

== Management ==
The transmitter is owned by TéléDiffusion de France and the dissemination of the Metropolitan French national legal time to the public is a joint responsibility of ANFR (state body for radio frequencies), the trade body France Horlogerie and the LNE-SYRTE and LNE-LTFB time laboratories.
