= Pölshals Pass =

- Location within Alps
- Elevation: 815 metres (2,674 ft)
- Traversed by: Federal Highways B 114 and B 114a

Third Approach
- Location: Austria
- Range: Alps
- Coordinates: 47°12′N 14°34′E

Pölshals Pass, elevation 815 m (2,674 ft), is a mountain pass in the Alps in the Austrian Bundesland of Styria. It connects Pöls with the valley of the Mur River.

The pass was already in use in Roman times.

== See also ==
- List of highest paved roads in Europe
- List of mountain passes
