= DCF77 =

German longwave time signal radio station

DCF77 time code transmitter
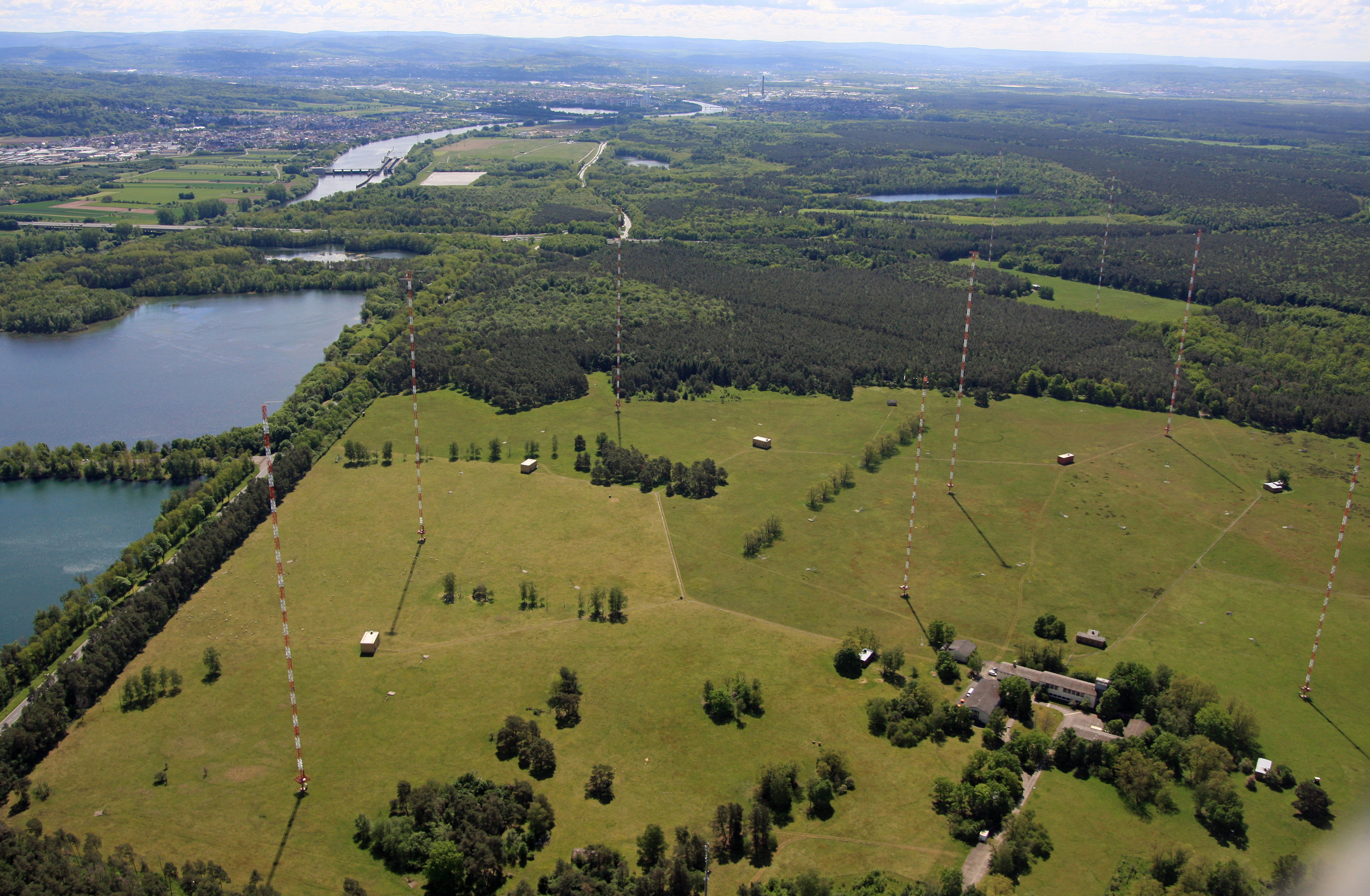
- The low frequency T-aerial antennas of DCF77 in Mainflingen
- Location: Mainflingen longwave transmitter, Mainflingen, Germany
- Coordinates: 50.01556°N 9.01083°E
- Elevation: 113 m (370 ft)
- Operator: Media Broadcast GmbH on behalf of the PTB
- Frequency: 77.5 kHz
- Power: 50 kW
- Began operation: 1 January 1959; continuous date and time information was added in June 1973
- Official range: 2,000 km (1,200 mi)
- Website: DCF 77

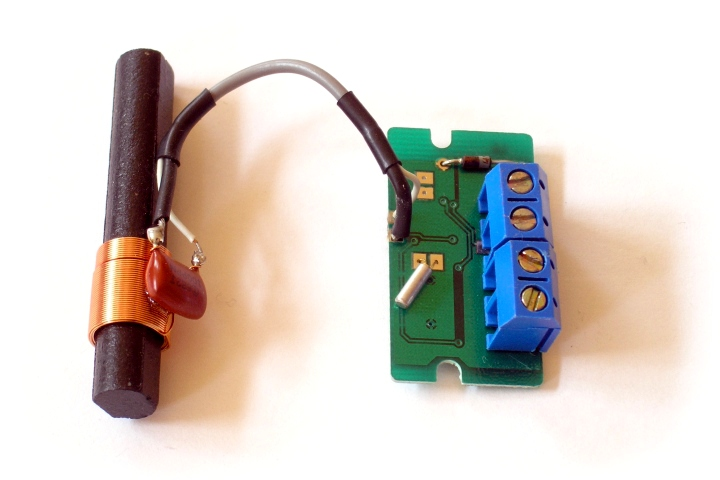
Low-cost DCF77 receiver

DCF77 is a German longwave time signal and standard-frequency radio station. It started service as a standard-frequency station on 1 January 1959. In June 1973, date and time information was added. Its primary and backup transmitters are located at 50°0′56″N 9°00′39″E in Mainflingen, about 27 km (17 mi) south-east of Frankfurt am Main, Germany. The transmitter generates a nominal power of 50 kW, of which about 30 to 35 kW can be radiated via a T-antenna.

DCF77 is controlled by the Physikalisch-Technische Bundesanstalt (PTB), Germany's national metrology institute and transmits in continuous operation (24 hours). It is operated by Media Broadcast GmbH (previously a subsidiary of Deutsche Telekom AG), on behalf of the PTB. With Media Broadcast GmbH, a temporal transmission availability of at least 99.7% per year or under 26.28 hours of annual downtime has been agreed upon. Most service interruptions are short-term disconnections of under two minutes. Longer lasting transmission service interruptions are generally caused by strong winds, freezing rain or snow-induced T-antenna movement. This manifests itself in electrical detuning of the antenna resonance circuit and hence a measurable phase modulation of the received signal. When the maladjustment is too large, the transmitter is taken out of service temporarily. In the year 2002, almost 99.95% availability, or just over 4.38 hours of downtime, was realized. The timestamp sent is either in Coordinated Universal Time (UTC)+1 or UTC+2 depending on daylight saving time.

The highly accurate 77.5 kHz (3868.2897806 m wavelength) carrier signal is generated from local atomic clocks that are linked with the German master clocks at the PTB in Braunschweig. The DCF77 time signal is used for the dissemination of the German national legal time to the public.

Radio clocks and watches have been very popular in Europe since the late 1980s and, in mainland Europe, most of them use the DCF77 signal to set their time automatically. The DCF77 longwave radio emission offers penetration into buildings and the time transmissions can be received by small ferrite antennas incorporated in the cases of radio-controlled low-cost time keepers without the help of exterior antennas. The accuracy of the DCF77 amplitude-modulated time signals suffices for the every-day use of clocks and watches by consumers where primarily the long-term accuracy matters. Further industrial time-keeping systems at railway stations, in the field of telecommunication and information technology, and at radio and TV stations are radio-controlled by DCF77 as well as tariff change-over clocks of energy supply companies and clocks in traffic-light facilities.

DCF77 primary and backup antenna

== Location of antennas ==
According to the Air-Line, the distance is 350 m between the primary and backup antenna. At a receiver pointing northwest or southeast, there is a maximum transit time of ${\frac {\pm 350\,\mathrm{m}} c} \approx \pm 1{,}3\,\mathrm{\mu s}$, and at a minimum, when exactly orthogonal, the transit time difference vanishes. The value for other geographical direction is somewhere inbetween.

== Signal ==
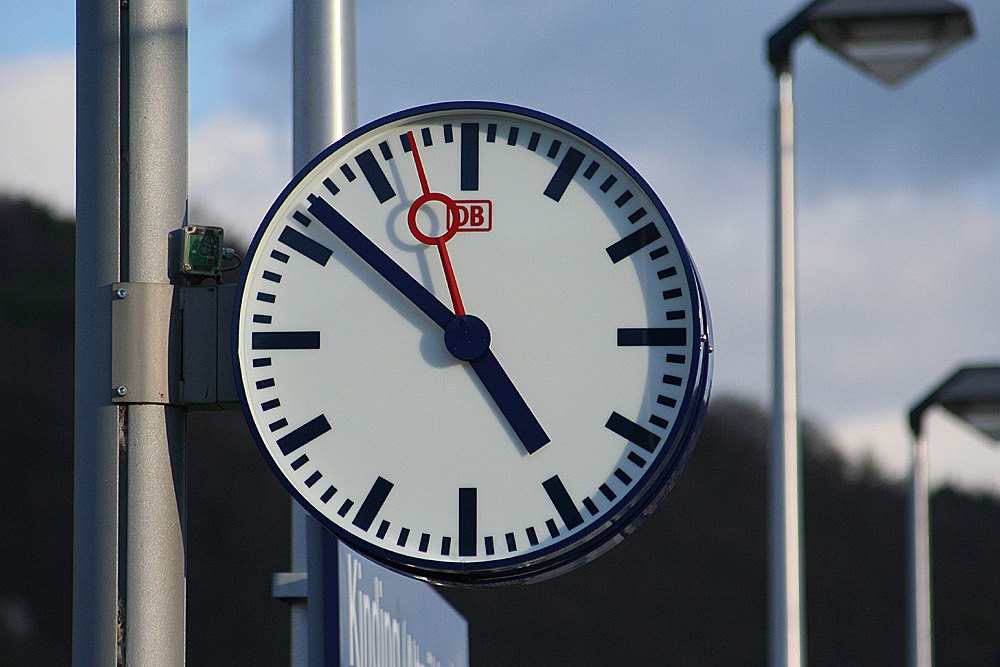
The DCF77 time signal is used by organizations like the Deutsche Bahn railway company to synchronize their station clocks.

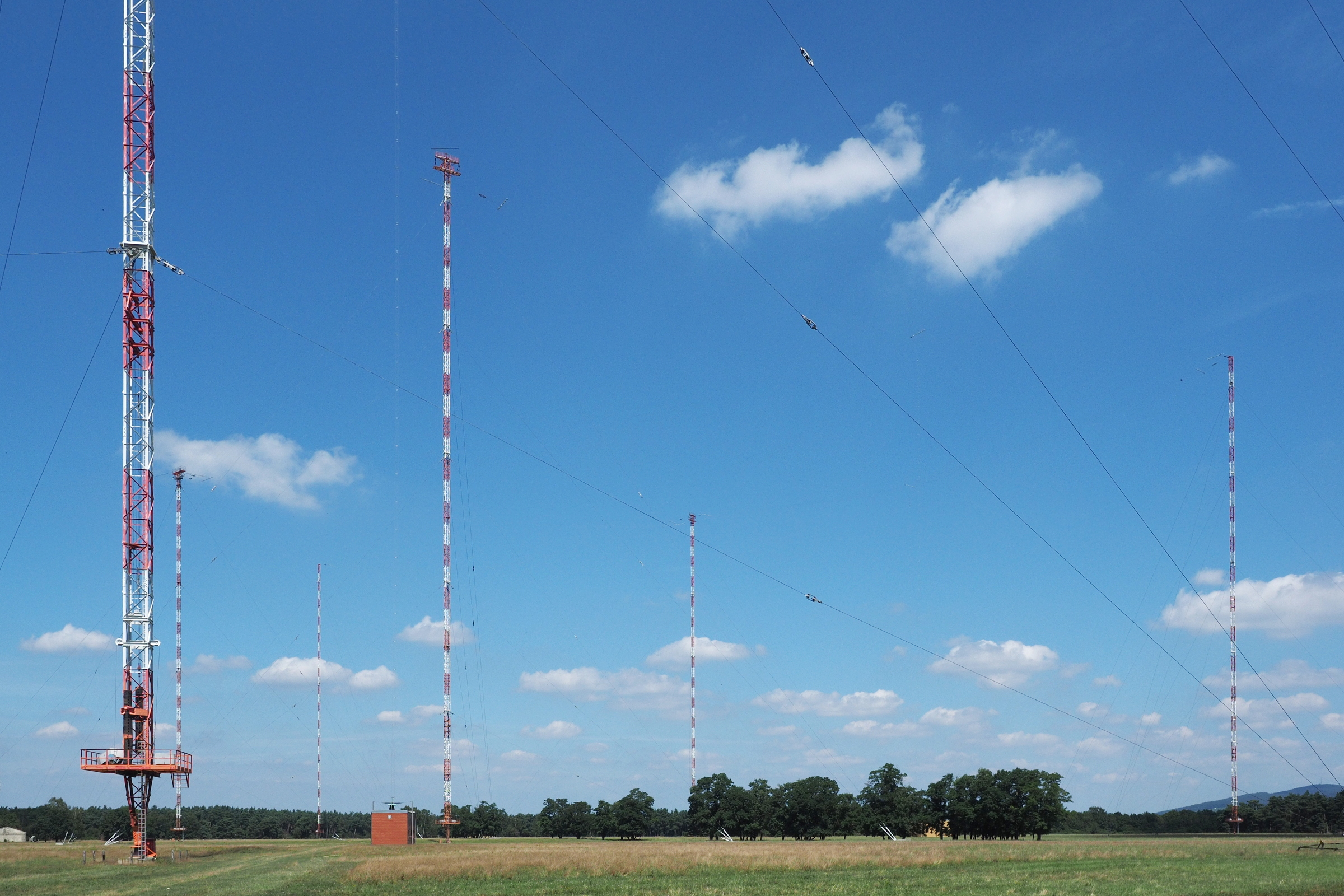
The Mainflingen transmitter uses isolated guyed lattice masts to elevate the DCF77 antennas.

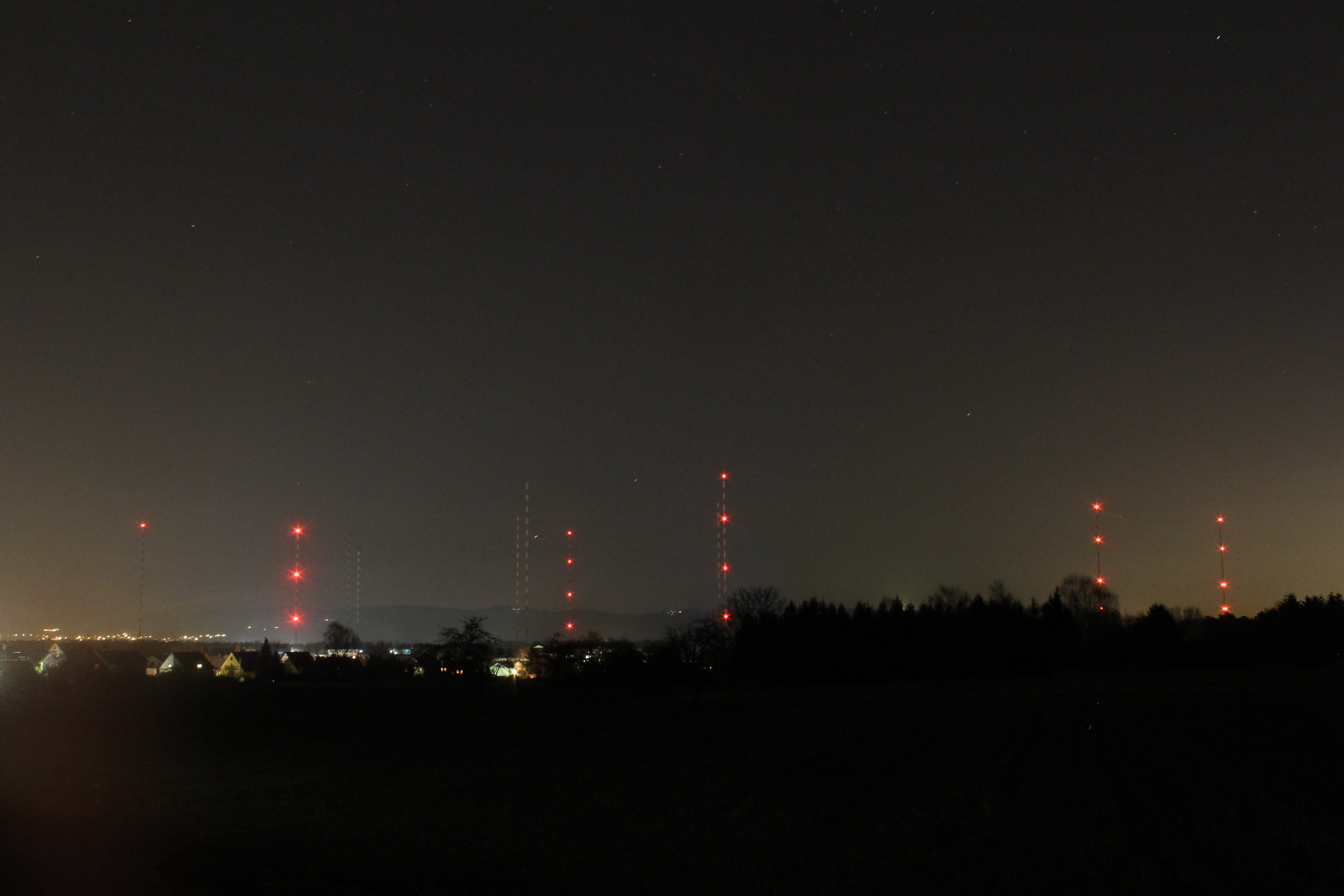
The low-frequency T-aerial antennas of the continuously operated DCF77 signal in Mainflingen at night

=== Time signal ===
The DCF77 station signal carries an amplitude-modulated, pulse-width coded 1 bit/s data signal. The same data signal is also phase modulated onto the carrier using a 512-bit long pseudorandom sequence (direct-sequence spread spectrum modulation). The transmitted data signal is repeated every minute.

- Current date and time bits;
- Leap second warning bit;
- Imminent change of CET to CEST, or vice versa, Announcement bit;
- Central European Time (CET) / Central European Summer Time (CEST) bit;
- Abnormal transmitter operation identification bit;
- Several parity bits.

=== Experimental civil defence emergency signal ===
Since 2003, fourteen previously unused bits of the time code have been used for civil defence emergency signals. This is an experimental service, aimed to one day replace the German network of civil defence sirens.

=== Civil protection and weather forecast signal ===
Since 22 November 2006, the DCF77 transmitter uses bits 1–14 to transmit warning messages and weather information. Under responsibility of the German Federal Office of Civil Protection and Disaster Assistance (the German Bundesamt für Bevölkerungsschutz und Katastrophenhilfe, BBK), warnings to the population can be transmitted using these 14 bits. As a further extension of the information content transmitted by DCF77, appropriately equipped radio clocks can provide a four-day weather forecast for 60 different regions in Europe. The forecast data is provided by and under responsibility of the Swiss company Meteo Time GmbH and is transferred in a proprietary transfer protocol. The same 14 bits are employed in a way that ensures compatibility with the transmission protocols of the warning messages. For decoding the weather forecast data, a license is required. Since the bits previously reserved for the PTB are used, older radio clocks should not be affected by the weather data signal.

Since 30 June 2026, the weather information is not transmitted, see German article.

=== Future and call sign ===
The signal distribution contract between the PTB and the DCF77 transmitter operator Media Broadcast GmbH is periodically renewed. After negotiations in 2021, the PTB and Media Broadcast GmbH agreed to continue the dissemination of the German national legal time for the next 10 years. In order to improve the reliability of the broadcast and also the ease of maintenance by the operator, Media Broadcast GmbH has announced that it will build a second remote-controllable high-performance transmitter in 2022. The facilities will then be completely duplicated on site. In the past the PTB expressed it will initialize new negotiations if modernization activities at the transmitting station to improve the signal reception reliability throughout Europe are deemed necessary.

The call sign DCF77 stands for D = Deutschland (Germany), C = long wave signal, F = Frankfurt am Main as the umbrella regional unit, 77 = frequency: 77.5 kHz.

== Time code details ==
Like most longwave time transmitters (akin to the 162 kHz 800 kW TDF time signal broadcast from France), DCF77 marks seconds by reducing carrier power for an interval beginning on the second. The duration of the reduction is varied to convey one bit of time code per second, repeating every minute. The carrier is synchronized so the rising zero-crossing occurs on the second. All modulation changes also occur at rising zero-crossings.

=== Amplitude modulation ===
Amplitude modulated signal of DCF77 as a function of time

The DCF77 signal uses amplitude-shift keying to transmit digitally coded time information by reducing the amplitude of the carrier to 15% of normal (−16½ dB) for 0.1 or 0.2 seconds at the beginning of each second. A 0.1 second reduction (7750 cycles of the 77500 Hz carrier amplitude) denotes a binary 0; a 0.2 second reduction denotes a binary 1. As a special case, the last second of every minute is marked with no carrier power reduction.

There was also a Morse code station identification until 2006, sent during minutes 19, 39 and 59 of each hour, however this was discontinued as the station is easily identifiable by the characteristic signal. A 250 Hz tone was generated by square wave modulating the carrier between 100% and 85% power, and that tone was used to send one letter per second, between the second marks. During seconds 20–32, the call sign "DCF77" was transmitted twice.

=== Phase modulation ===
In addition, for 793 ms beginning at 200 ms, each time code bit is transmitted using direct-sequence spread spectrum. The bit is mixed with a 512-bit pseudo-random chip sequence and encoded on the carrier using ±15.6° phase-shift keying. The chip sequence contains equal amounts of each phase, so the average phase remains unchanged. Each chip spans 120 cycles of the carrier, so the exact duration is cycles 15500 through 76940 out of 77500. The last 560 cycles (7.23 ms) of each second are not phase-modulated.

The chip sequence is generated by a 9-bit linear feedback shift register (LFSR), repeats every second, and begins with 00000100011000010011100101010110000….

A software implementation of a Galois LFSR can generate the full chip sequence:

  unsigned int i, lfsr;
  lfsr = 0;

  for (i = 0; i < 512; i++) {
    unsigned int chip;

    chip = lfsr & 1;
    output_chip(chip);

    lfsr >>= 1;
    if (chip ^ !lfsr)
      lfsr ^= 0x110;
  }

Each time code bit to be transmitted is exclusive-ored with the LFSR output. The final chipped sequence is used to modulate the transmitter phase. During 0 chips the carrier is transmitted with a +15.6° phase advance, while during 1 chips it is transmitted with a −15.6° phase lag.

In lieu of the special minute marker used in the amplitude code, bit 59 is transmitted as an ordinary 0-bit, and the first 10 bits (seconds 0–9) are transmitted as binary 1.

When compared to amplitude modulation, phase modulation makes better use of the available frequency spectrum and results in a more precise low frequency time distribution with less sensitivity to interferences. Phase modulation is however not used by many DCF77 receivers. The reason for this is the worldwide availability of the (precise time reference) signals transmitted by global navigation satellite systems like the Global Positioning System (GPS), GLONASS, Galileo and BeiDou. Due to the GPS signal structure and the larger bandwidth available, the GPS reception would, in principle, achieve an uncertainty of the time transmission that is lower by at least one order of magnitude than the uncertainty that can be achieved with DCF77 phase modulation receiving hardware (GPS time is accurate to about ± 10 to 30 nanoseconds and the Galileo April, May, June 2021 Quarterly Performance Report by the European GNSS Service Centre reported the UTC Time Dissemination Service Accuracy was ≤ 4.3 ns, computed by accumulating samples over the previous 12 months and exceeding the ≤ 30 ns target).

=== Time code interpretation ===
The time is represented in binary-coded decimal. It represents civil time, including summer time adjustments. The time transmitted is the time of the following minute; e. g. during 31 December, 23:59, the transmitted time encodes 1 January, 00:00.

The first 20 seconds are special flags. The minutes are encoded in seconds 21–28, hours during seconds 29–34, and the date during seconds 36–58.

Two flags warn of changes to occur at the end of the current hour: a change of time zones, and a leap second insertion. These flags are set during the hour up to the event. This includes the last minute before the event, during which the other time code bits (including the time zone indicator bits) encode the time of the first minute after the event.

DCF77 time code
Bit	Weight		Meaning	Bit	Weight		Meaning	Bit	Weight		Meaning
Bit	PhM	AM	Meaning	Bit	PhM	AM	Meaning	Bit	PhM	AM	Meaning
:00	1	M	Start of minute. Always 0.	:20	S		Start of encoded time. Always 1.	:40	10		Day of month (continued)
:01	1	Civil warning bits, provided by the Bundesamt für Bevölkerungsschutz und Katastrophenwarnung (Federal Office of Civil protection and Disaster Relief). Also contains weather broadcasts.		:21	1		Minutes; 00–59	:41	20		Day of month (continued)
:02	1	Civil warning bits, provided by the Bundesamt für Bevölkerungsschutz und Katastrophenwarnung (Federal Office of Civil protection and Disaster Relief). Also contains weather broadcasts.		:22	2		Minutes; 00–59	:42	1		Day of week Monday=1, Sunday=7
:03	1	Civil warning bits, provided by the Bundesamt für Bevölkerungsschutz und Katastrophenwarnung (Federal Office of Civil protection and Disaster Relief). Also contains weather broadcasts.		:23	4		Minutes; 00–59	:43	2		Day of week Monday=1, Sunday=7
:04	1	Civil warning bits, provided by the Bundesamt für Bevölkerungsschutz und Katastrophenwarnung (Federal Office of Civil protection and Disaster Relief). Also contains weather broadcasts.		:24	8		Minutes; 00–59	:44	4		Day of week Monday=1, Sunday=7
:05	1	Civil warning bits, provided by the Bundesamt für Bevölkerungsschutz und Katastrophenwarnung (Federal Office of Civil protection and Disaster Relief). Also contains weather broadcasts.		:25	10		Minutes; 00–59	:45	1		Month number 01–12
:06	1	Civil warning bits, provided by the Bundesamt für Bevölkerungsschutz und Katastrophenwarnung (Federal Office of Civil protection and Disaster Relief). Also contains weather broadcasts.		:26	20		Minutes; 00–59	:46	2		Month number 01–12
:07	1	Civil warning bits, provided by the Bundesamt für Bevölkerungsschutz und Katastrophenwarnung (Federal Office of Civil protection and Disaster Relief). Also contains weather broadcasts.		:27	40		Minutes; 00–59	:47	4		Month number 01–12
:08	1	Civil warning bits, provided by the Bundesamt für Bevölkerungsschutz und Katastrophenwarnung (Federal Office of Civil protection and Disaster Relief). Also contains weather broadcasts.		:28	P1		Even parity over minute bits 21–27.	:48	8		Month number 01–12
:09	1	Civil warning bits, provided by the Bundesamt für Bevölkerungsschutz und Katastrophenwarnung (Federal Office of Civil protection and Disaster Relief). Also contains weather broadcasts.		:29	1		Hours; 0–23	:49	10		Month number 01–12
:10	0	Civil warning bits, provided by the Bundesamt für Bevölkerungsschutz und Katastrophenwarnung (Federal Office of Civil protection and Disaster Relief). Also contains weather broadcasts.		:30	2		Hours; 0–23	:50	1		Year within century 00–99
:11	0	Civil warning bits, provided by the Bundesamt für Bevölkerungsschutz und Katastrophenwarnung (Federal Office of Civil protection and Disaster Relief). Also contains weather broadcasts.		:31	4		Hours; 0–23	:51	2		Year within century 00–99
:12	0	Civil warning bits, provided by the Bundesamt für Bevölkerungsschutz und Katastrophenwarnung (Federal Office of Civil protection and Disaster Relief). Also contains weather broadcasts.		:32	8		Hours; 0–23	:52	4		Year within century 00–99
:13	0	Civil warning bits, provided by the Bundesamt für Bevölkerungsschutz und Katastrophenwarnung (Federal Office of Civil protection and Disaster Relief). Also contains weather broadcasts.		:33	10		Hours; 0–23	:53	8		Year within century 00–99
:14	0	Civil warning bits, provided by the Bundesamt für Bevölkerungsschutz und Katastrophenwarnung (Federal Office of Civil protection and Disaster Relief). Also contains weather broadcasts.		:34	20		Hours; 0–23	:54	10		Year within century 00–99
:15	R		Call bit: abnormal transmitter operation. Previously: backup antenna in use.	:35	P2		Even parity over hour bits 29–34.	:55	20		Year within century 00–99
:16	A1		Summer time/standard time changeover announcement. Set during hour before change.	:36	1		Day of month. 01–31	:56	40		Year within century 00–99
:17	Z1		Set to 1 when CEST is in effect.	:37	2		Day of month. 01–31	:57	80		Year within century 00–99
:18	Z2		Set to 1 when CET is in effect.	:38	4		Day of month. 01–31	:58	P3		Even parity over date bits 36–57.
:19	A2		Leap second announcement. Set during hour before leap second.	:39	8		Day of month. 01–31	:59	0	Minute mark: no amplitude modulation.	

In the event of an added leap second, a 0-bit is inserted during second 59, and the special missing bit is transmitted during the leap second itself, second 60.

Although the time code only includes two digits of year, it is possible to deduce two bits of century using the day of week. There is still a 400-year ambiguity, as the Gregorian calendar repeats weeks every 400 years, but this is sufficient to determine which years ending in 00 are leap years.

The time zone bits can be considered a binary-coded representation of the UTC offset. Z1 set indicates UTC+2, while Z2 indicates UTC+1.

The phase modulation generally encodes the same data as the amplitude modulation, but differs for bits 59 through 14, inclusive. Bit 59 (no amplitude modulation) is phase-modulated as a 0-bit. Bits 0–9 are phase modulated as 1 bits, and bits 10–14 are phase modulated as 0 bits. The civil protection warnings and weather information is not included in the phase-modulated data.

== Reception area ==
DCF77 reception area from Mainflingen

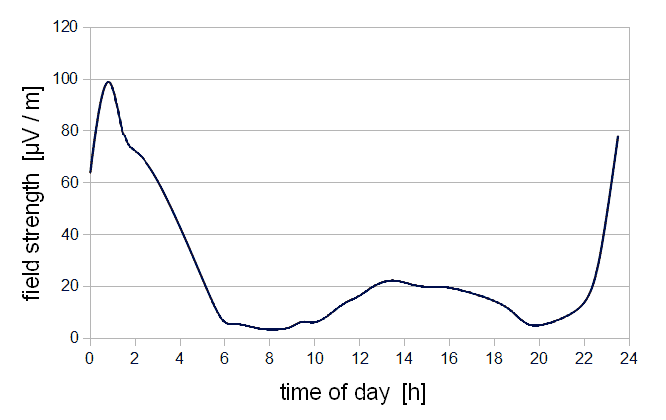
DCF77 signal strength over a 24-hour period measured in Nerja, on the south coast of Spain 1,800 km (1,100 mi) from the transmitter. Around 1 AM, it peaks at ≈ 100 μV/m signal strength. During the day, the signal is weakened by ionization of the ionosphere due to solar activity.

With a relatively high power of 50 kW, the DCF77 transmissions can reliably be received in large parts of Europe, as far as 2,000 km (1,200 mi) from the transmitter in Mainflingen. Within this range the signal strength of the DCF77 signal as specified by the Physikalisch-Technische Bundesanstalt (PTB) is ≥ 100 μV/m. This signal strength assessment was made according to the reflection model with a reflection (one hop) on the ionospheric D-layer. As an example, reception with consumer grade clocks — assuming the employed radio clock can manage reception with ≈ 100 μV/m signal strength — is possible in Norway (Bodø), Russia (Moscow), Turkey (Istanbul), Gibraltar and Portugal (during night hours). Metal structures or interference caused by other electronic devices can cause reception problems within this range. At shorter distances the DCF77 signal strength is much higher. As an example, under 500 km (300 mi) from the transmitter in Mainflingen the expected signal strength of the ground wave is ≥ 1 mV/m.

Depending on signal propagation and multiple reflections (hops) and local interference the DCF77 signal can sometimes be received further away (see tropospheric propagation). This is associated with a significant decrease in the signal strength and depends on many factors, e.g., the daytime and season, the angle of incidence of the skywave on the D-layer and the solar activity.

== Control ==
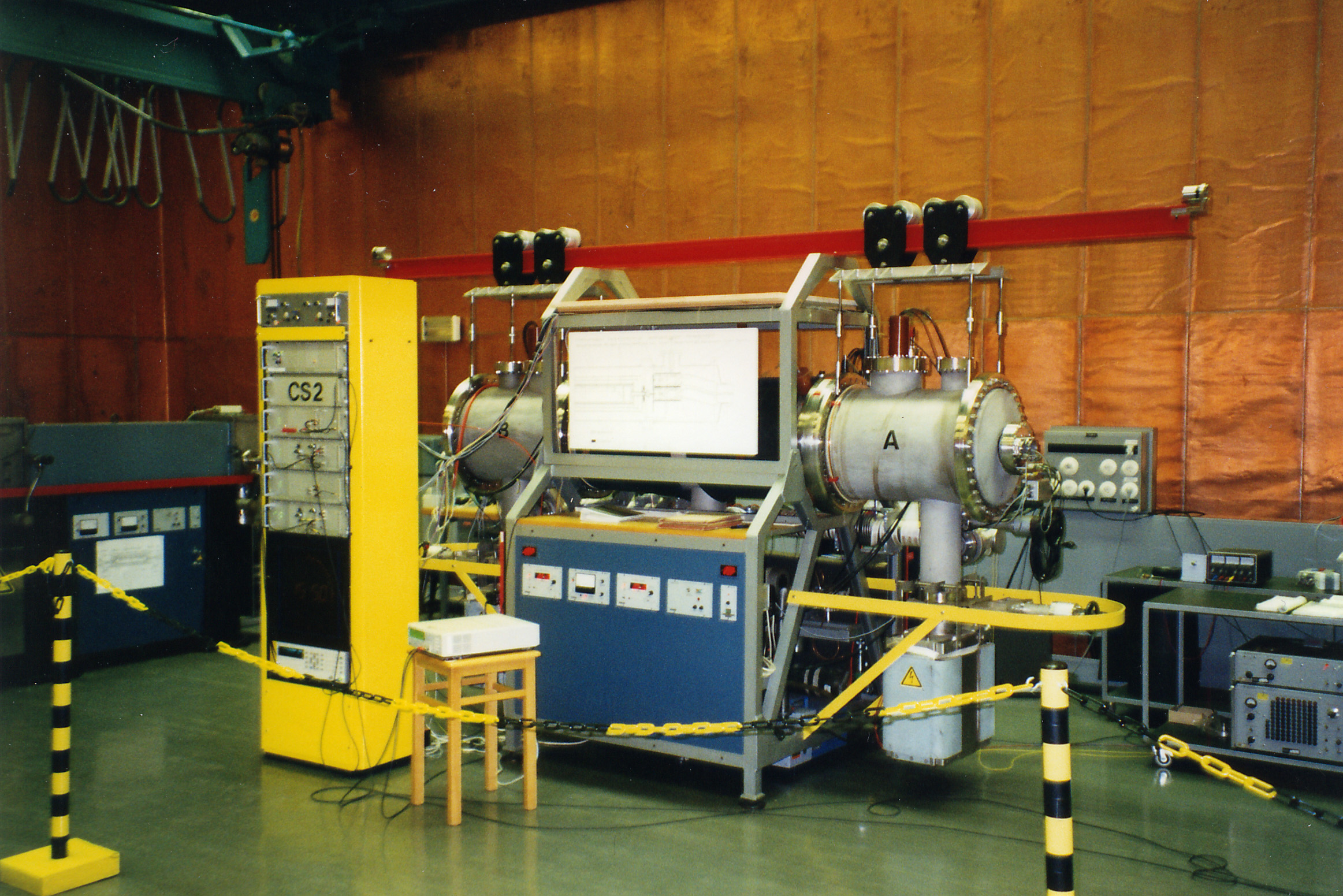
Atomic master clock CS2 in use at the PTB to check for deviations

The control signal is not transmitted by wire from the Physikalisch-Technische Bundesanstalt (PTB) in Braunschweig to the transmitting radio station in Mainflingen but is generated at the place of emission using a control unit developed by the PTB. This control unit, which is housed in an air conditioned room of the transmitting station, is shielded against high-frequency interferences and controlled from Braunschweig. For reasons of operational reliability, the control signal is generated by three independent control channels all equipped with their own caesium atomic clock. In addition a rubidium atomic clock is available on site. To avoid incorrect emissions the output of these three channels are compared in two electronic switch circuits on site. Output for transmission is only generated when at least two of the three channels are in agreement. Via the public telephone network operational data of the control unit can be called up with the aid of a telecontrol system. Furthermore, the carrier phase time and the states of the second markers are compared in Braunschweig with the setpoints specified by the PTB's atomic master clocks that provide the UTC (PTB). Of these atomic clocks, the CS2 atomic clock in Braunschweig provides the German national legal time standard, and can be used as a highly accurate frequency standard. If there are deviations, the necessary corrections will be made via the telecontrol system.

== Accuracy ==
=== Transmission ===
The DCF77 transmitted carrier frequency relative uncertainty is 2 × 10^{−12} over a 24-hour period and 2 × 10^{−13} over 100 days, with a deviation in phase with respect to UTC that never exceeds 5.5 ± 0.3 microseconds. The four German primary caesium (fountain) atomic clocks (CS1, CS2, CSF1 and CSF2) in use by the PTB in Braunschweig ensure significantly less long term clock drift than the atomic clocks used in the DCF77 facility in Mainflingen. With the aid of external corrections from Braunschweig the control unit of DCF77 in Mainflingen is expected to neither gain nor lose a second in approximately 300,000 years.

In theory, a DCF77 controlled external clock should be able to synchronize to within one half of the period of the transmitted 77.5 kHz carrier frequency of the DCF77 signal, or within ± 6.452 × 10^{−6} s or ± 6.452 microseconds.

=== Reception ===
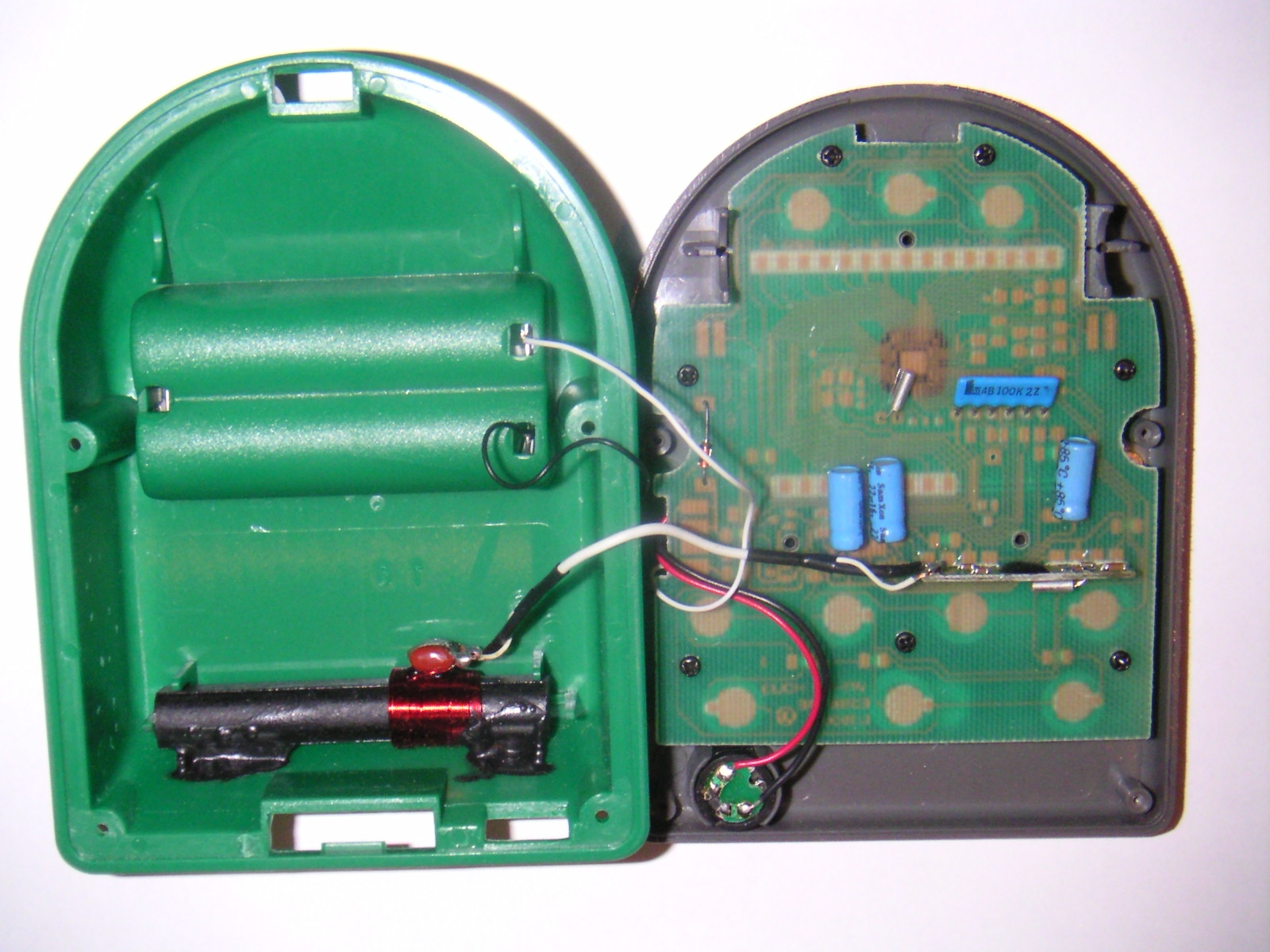
Consumer grade radio clock movement with the DCF77 receiver (right) in the clock. The small ferrite loopstick antenna used in this alarm clock can be seen at the left.

Due to the propagation process, phase and/or frequency shifts observed in received signals the practical obtainable accuracy is lower than originally realized with the atomic clocks at the place of transmission. As with any time signal radio transmitter the precise establishment of time is affected by the distance to the transmitter, as the time signal propagates to a time signal receiver at the speed of light. For a DCF77 receiver located 1,000 km (600 mi) away from the DCF77 transmitter, due to transit delay the receiver will be set more than 3 milliseconds late. Such a small deviation will seldom be of interest and if desired instrument grade time receivers can be corrected for transit delay.

Further inaccuracies may be caused by the type of wave the receiver records. If pure ground wave reception is anticipated and the reception location is permanent a constant may be included in the calculation, while in the case of pure space waves the receiver cannot compensate for the fluctuations since these are the result of the changing altitude of the reflecting and bending layer of the ionosphere. Similar problems arise where ground and skywaves overlap. This field is not constant but changes in the course of the day between approximately 600 to 1,100 km (400 to 700 mi) from the transmitter position.

Corrected instrument grade DCF77 receivers, using the amplitude-modulated time signals with accompanying antennas oriented tangential to the transmitter's antenna in Mainflingen to ensure the best possible interference-free time signal reception at fixed locations, can achieve a practical accuracy uncertainty better than ± 2 milliseconds.

In addition to the amplitude-modulated time signal transmission this information is also transmitted since June 1983 by DCF77 via a phase modulation of the carrier wave with a pseudorandom noise sequence of 512 bits length. Using cross-correlation the reproduced signal at the receiving end can be used to determine the beginning of the second markers much more accurately. The drawback of using phase-modulated time signals lies in the complex instrument grade receiving hardware required for using this time signal reception method. Using this method the Physikalisch-Technische Bundesanstalt (PTB) measured standard deviations of ± 2 to 22 microseconds between UTC (PTB) and UTC (DCF77), depending on the time in the day and season. This was done in Braunschweig located 273 km (170 mi) from the transmitter in Mainflingen.

Normal low cost consumer grade DCF77 receivers solely rely on the amplitude-modulated time signals and use narrow band receivers (with 10 Hz bandwidth) with small ferrite loopstick antennas and circuits with non optimal digital signal processing delay and can therefore only be expected to determine the beginning of a second with a practical accuracy uncertainty of ± 0.1 second. This is sufficient for radio controlled low cost consumer grade clocks and watches using standard-quality quartz clocks for timekeeping between daily DCF77 synchronization attempts, as they will be most accurate immediately after a successful synchronization and will become less accurate from that point forward until the next synchronization. Some DCF77 controlled consumer grade quartz movements promote accurate time keeping by synchronizing and correcting their time automatically more than once spread over a day.

== Network Time Protocol reference clock use ==
Network Time Protocol time servers display the reference ID (REFID) .DCFa. (amplitude modulation) or .DCFp. (phase modulation) when a standard DCF77 time receiver is used as the reference time source. Some time servers display .PZF. as reference ID. These time servers evaluate the pseudo-random sequence (or pseudozufällige Folge in German) that is added to the amplitude modulation to achieve microsecond accuracy.

== See also ==
- ALS162 time signal, similar time service in France
- Time from NPL (MSF), similar time service in the United Kingdom
- WWVB, similar time service in the United States
