= Pöls-Oberkurzheim =

- Municipality
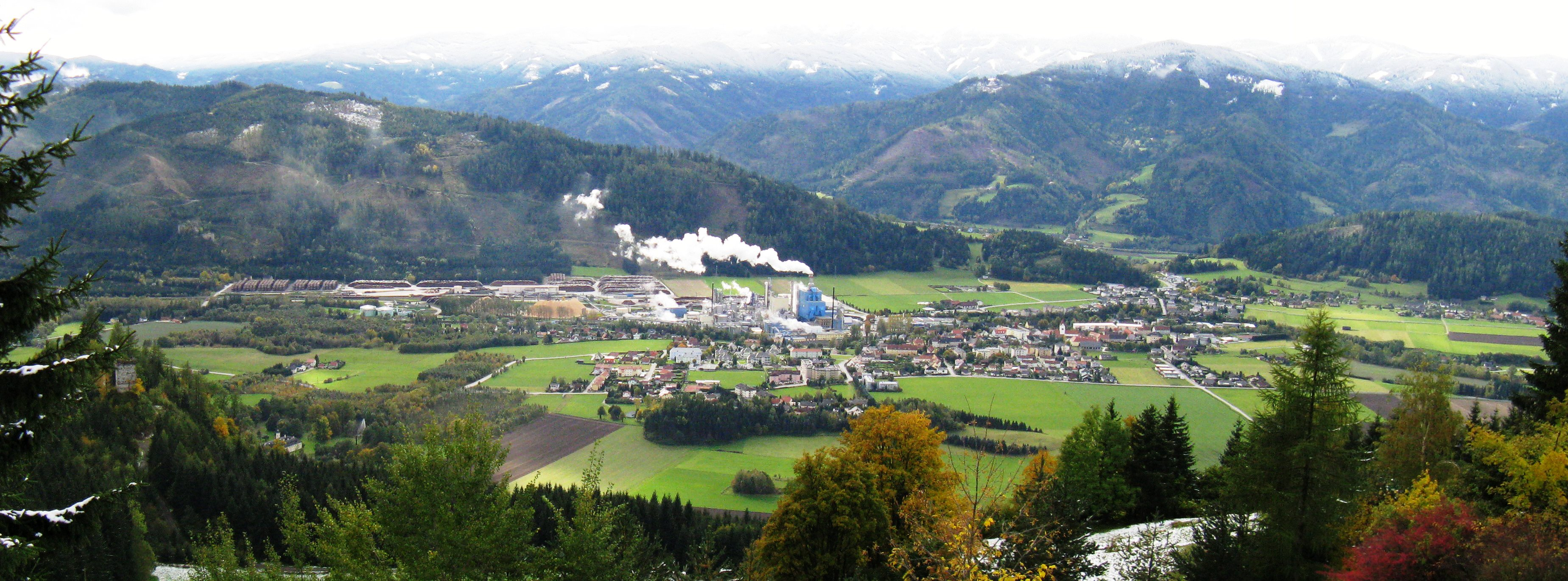
- View of Pöls

- Location within Austria
- Coordinates: 47°13′10″N 14°35′02″E
- Country: Austria
- State: Styria
- District: Murtal

Government
  - Mayor: Gernot Esser (SPÖ)

Area
  - Total: 62.63 km^{2} (24.18 sq mi)
- Elevation: 861 m (2,825 ft)

Population (2018-01-01)
  - Total: 2,969
  - Density: 47.41/km^{2} (122.8/sq mi)
- Time zone: UTC+1 (CET)
  - Summer (DST): UTC+2 (CEST)
- Postal code: 8753, 8754, 8761, 8762
- Website: www.poels.at

Pöls-Oberkurzheim is a municipality since 2015 in the Murtal District of Styria, Austria.

The municipality, Pöls-Oberkurzheim, was created as part of the Styria municipal structural reform, at the end of 2014, by merging the former market town Pöls with the municipality Oberkurzheim.

== Geography ==
=== Municipality arrangement ===
The municipality territory includes the following 21 sections (populations as of 1 January 2015):

- Allerheiligen (24)
- Allerheiligengraben (12)
- Enzersdorf (127)
- Götzendorf (97)
- Greith (104)
- Gusterheim (195)
- Katzling (138)
- Mauterndorf (178)
- Mosing (22)
- Mühltal (11)
- Oberkurzheim (133)
- Offenburg (29)
- Paig (64)
- Paßhammer (15)
- Pöls (1538)
- Pölshof (23)
- Sauerbrunn (25)
- Thalheim (158)
- Thaling (83)
- Unterzeiring (15)
- Winden (56)

The municipality consists of the six Katastralgemeinden Allerheiligen, Enzersdorf, Oberkurzheim, Pöls, Thalheim and Unterzeiring.

=== Tourismus ===
The municipality formed, together with Pusterwald and Pölstal, the tourism agency "Region Pölstal". The base is in the town Pölstal.

== Culture and sights ==
- Pfarrkirche Allerheiligen in Pöls
