= Haut Débit Radio Régional =

Consortium of French WiMAX service providers

Haut Débit Radio Régional ("regional radio broadband") is a French WiMAX service provider consortium. Members of the consortium include TDF Group (the majority shareholder), Axione and LD Collectivités, with extra investment provided by the Caisse des Dépôts et Consignations. It holds 11 of the regional licences for WiMAX spectrum in France.

== See also ==
- List of deployed WiMAX networks
