= Oberkurzheim =

- Former municipality
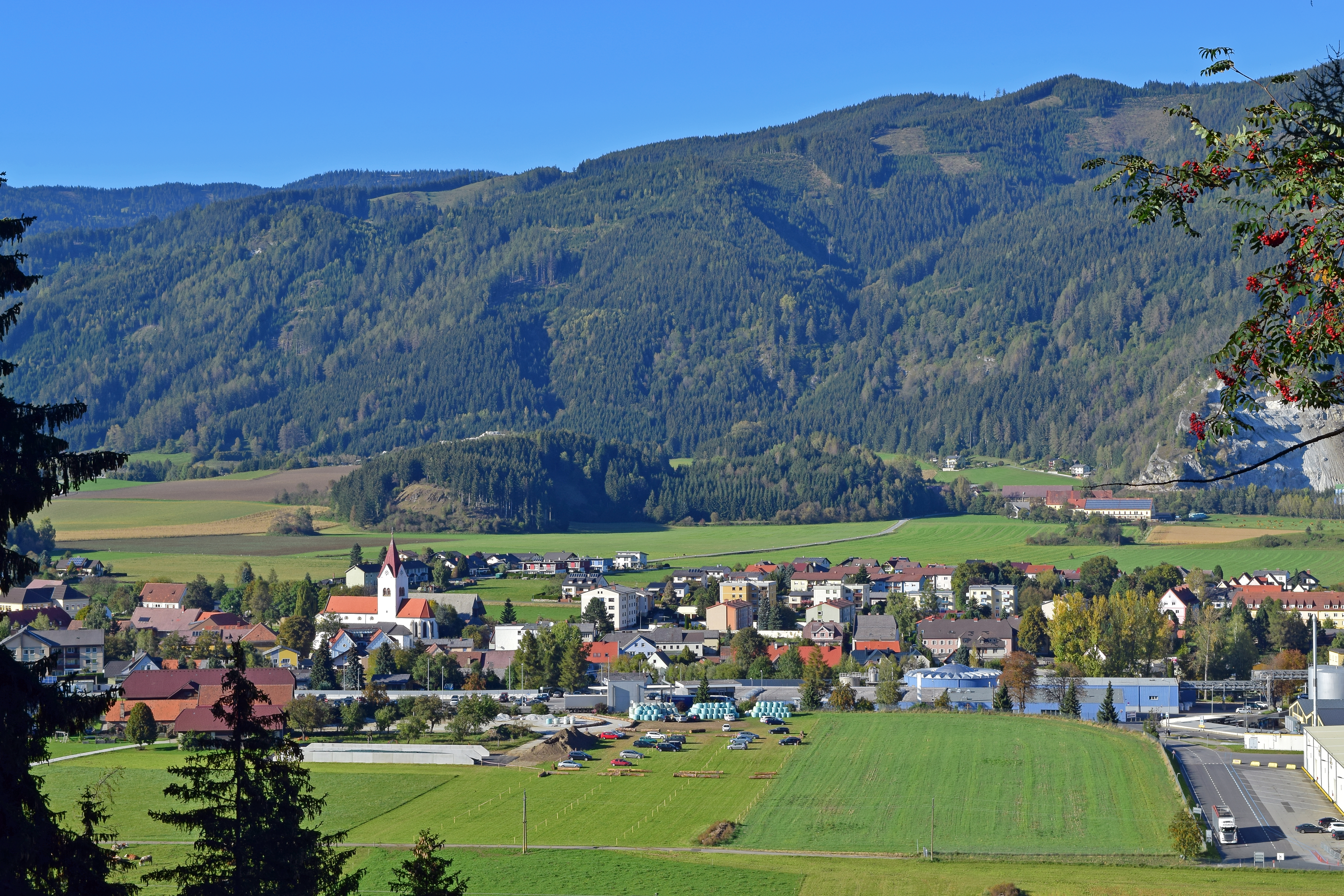
- View of Pöls and Oberkurzheim

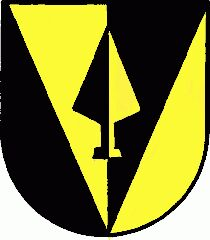
- Coat of arms

- Location within Austria
- Coordinates: 47°14′00″N 14°35′00″E
- Country: Austria
- State: Styria
- District: Murtal

Area
  - Total: 29.15 km^{2} (11.25 sq mi)
- Elevation: 861 m (2,825 ft)

Population (1 January 2016)
  - Total: 694
  - Density: 23.8/km^{2} (61.7/sq mi)
- Time zone: UTC+1 (CET)
  - Summer (DST): UTC+2 (CEST)
- Postal code: 8761
- Area code: 0 35 79
- Vehicle registration: JU
- Website: www.oberkurzheim.at

Oberkurzheim is a former municipality in the district of Murtal in Styria, Austria. Since the 2015 Styria municipal structural reform, it is part of the municipality Pöls-Oberkurzheim.
