= Mainflingen =

- Ortsteil of Mainhausen
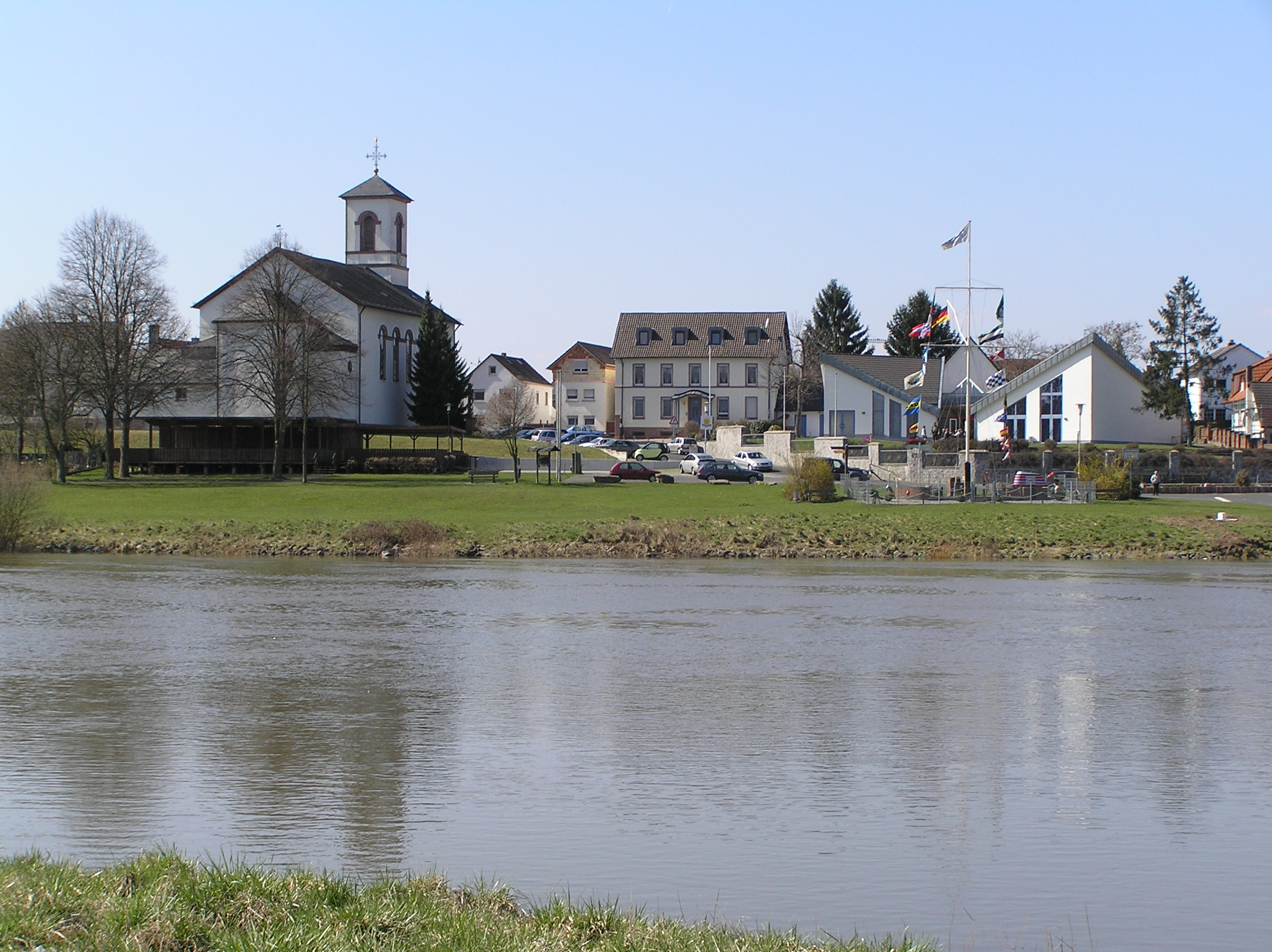
- View overlooking the river Main with the local church in the background

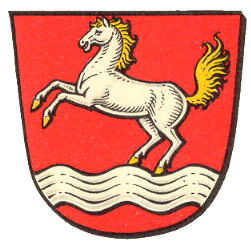
- Coat of arms
- Interactive map of Mainflingen
- Location within Germany Location within Hesse
- Country: Germany
- State: Hesse
- Admin. region: Darmstadt
- District: Offenbach
- Municipality: Mainhausen

Area
  - Total: 9.30 km^{2} (3.59 sq mi)
- Elevation: 110 m (360 ft)

Population (2017-12-31)
  - Total: 4,206
  - Density: 452/km^{2} (1,170/sq mi)
- Time zone: UTC+01:00 (CET)
  - Summer (DST): UTC+02:00 (CEST)
- Postal codes: 63533
- Dialling codes: 06182

Mainflingen is a village and part (Ortsteil) of the municipality Mainhausen, in the district of Offenbach in Hesse with about 4000 inhabitants. It is known for its time signal transmitter, DCF77, which controls almost all radio clocks in Western Europe.

== Geography ==
=== Location ===
Mainflingen is part of the municipality Mainhausen, which lies in the Offenbach district, located in the southernmost part of the state Hesse right on the border with Bavaria. It lies near the river Main.

=== Constituent communities ===
Mainflingen is one of the two constituent communities of Mainhausen, the other one is Zellhausen.

== History ==
Mainflingen was first mentioned in a document from the year 775. In this and other documents from 793, 796 and 799 it is confirmed that citizens of the municipality Manolfingen bequeathed fields and meadows to the monastery Lorsch. Researchers believe that the name is not derived from the river Main, but from a man named Manolf and his ancestors.

A document confirms that Witch-hunts also occurred in Mainflingen.

As a direct consequence of the Thirty Years' War, Mainflingen and the surrounding communities had suffered severe population losses.

=== Coat of arms ===
The coat of arms was approved by the Hessian Ministry of the Interior and Sport on 2 June 1955.

- Blazon The coat of arms of Mainflingen depicts a red shield with a silver wave band and an ascending white horse above it.
