= Pöls =

- Former municipality
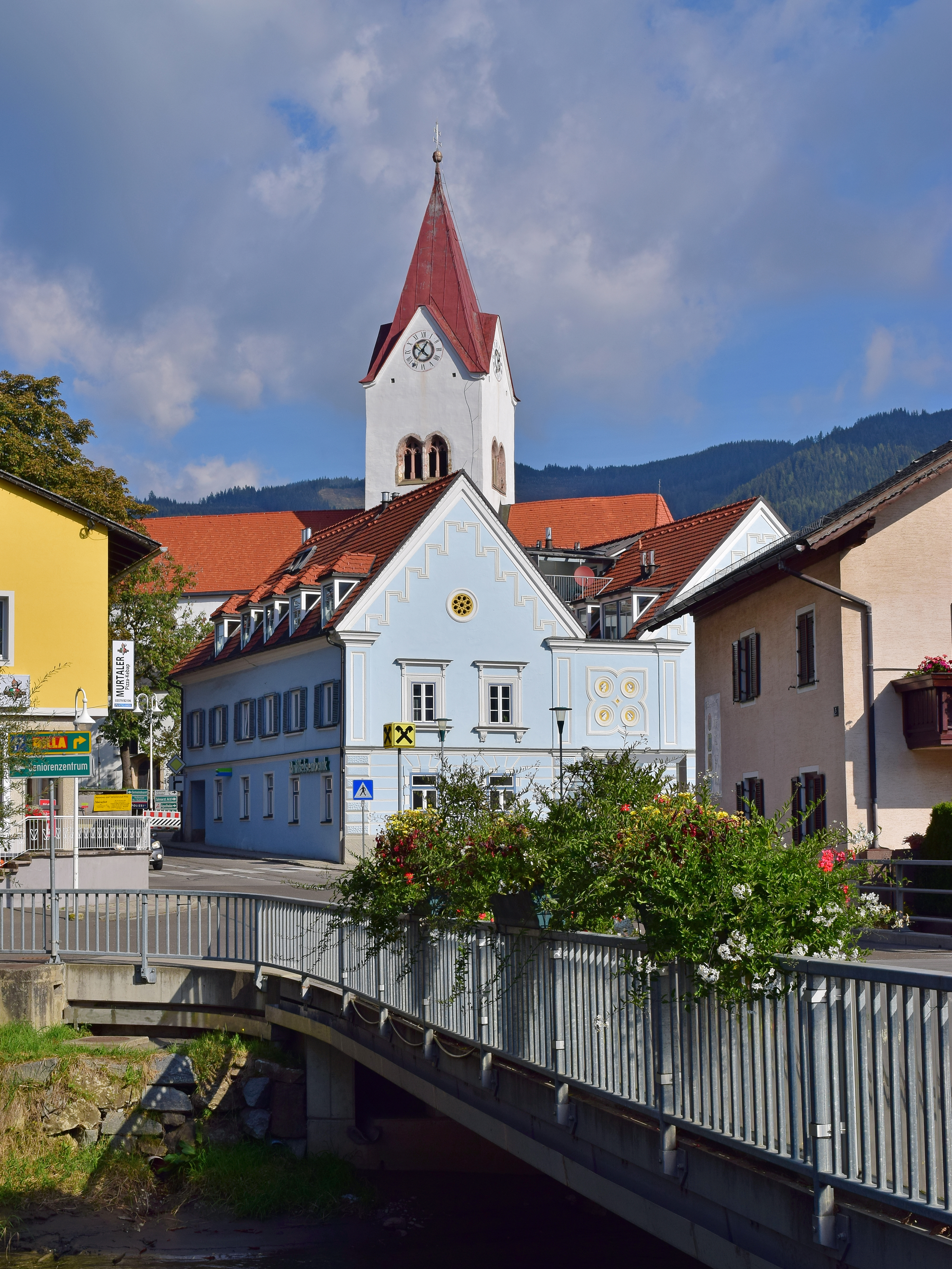

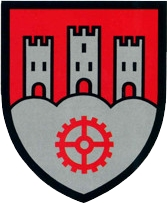
- Coat of arms

- Location within Austria
- Coordinates: 47°13′10″N 14°35′02″E
- Country: Austria
- State: Styria
- District: Murtal

Area
  - Total: 33.52 km^{2} (12.94 sq mi)
- Elevation: 790 m (2,590 ft)

Population (1 January 2016)
  - Total: 2,367
  - Density: 70.61/km^{2} (182.9/sq mi)
- Time zone: UTC+1 (CET)
  - Summer (DST): UTC+2 (CEST)
- Postal code: 8761, 8754 Thalheim
- Area code: 03579
- Vehicle registration: JU
- Website: www.poels.at

Pöls is a former municipality in the district of Murtal in Styria, Austria. Since the 2015 Styria municipal structural reform, it is part of the municipality Pöls-Oberkurzheim.
