= TDF Group =

French company

- Industry: Radio and television transmission
- Founded: 6 January 1975
- Headquarters: Paris, France
- Website: TDF Website

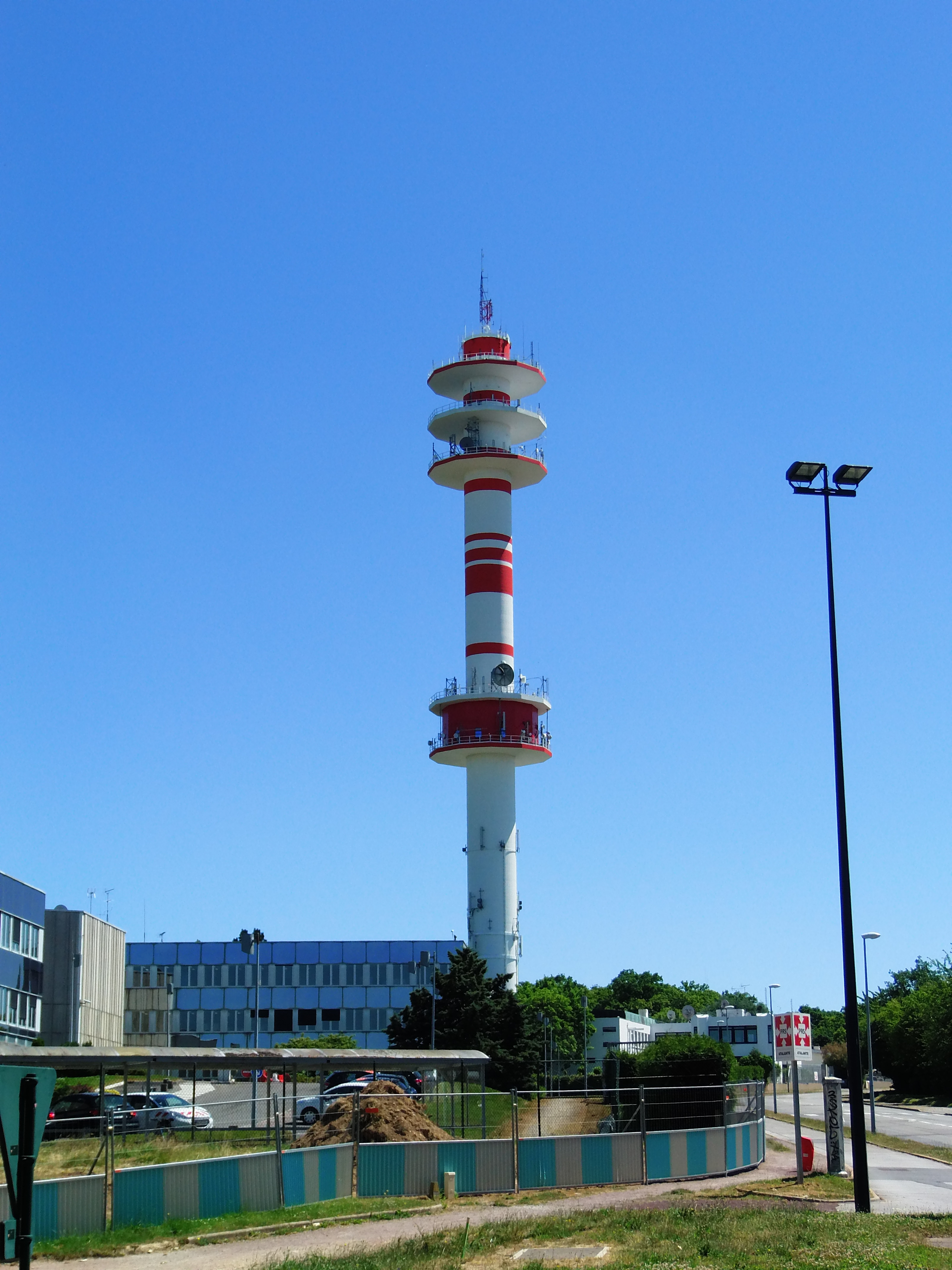
TDF tower near Rennes

TDF (which stands for Télédiffusion de France officially renamed TDF in 2004) is a French company which provides radio and television transmission services, services for telecommunications operators, and other multimedia services – digitization of content, encoding, storage, etc.

Its headquarters are located in Paris. It is the dominant partner in the HDRR WiMAX consortium and is also part of Digital Radio Mondiale.

== Arkena ==
Arkena was European company that regroups four entities: Cognacq-Jay Image (France), PSN (Poland), Qbrick (Sweden) and SmartJog (France). These entities were all part of the Media Services division of the TDF Group. Arkena provides full end-to-end media services such as playout services, OTT (over-the-top content), Online video platform including stand-alone solutions for file transfer, storage and content preparation for any media.

Arkena was officially launched on 20 January 2014. Its headquarters are located in Paris and it operates offices in London, Los Angeles, Madrid, Warsaw, Stockholm, Copenhagen, Aarhus, Gothenburg, Helsinki, Ivry-sur-Seine, and Turku. Almost 500 people are part of the Arkena organization. Arkena went out of business as company in December 2019 and after a management buy-out, Cognac-Jay Image took over.

== History ==
Télédiffusion de France was created in 1975 as part of the split-up of the formerly-unitary national broadcaster Office de Radiodiffusion Télévision Française (ORTF) into seven separate organisations. TDF therefore inherited the ORTF's transmitter network and other technical assets, and from 1984 also provided broadcasting-related services to the French private TV channels.

The TDF Group created its media services division in 2004 through a combination of acquisitions and organic growth. Now, TDF Media Services regroups Arkena and BeBanjo.

- Cognacq-Jay Image was located in Cognacq-Jay street in Paris, in the building that is considered as the cradle of French television. Since 1996, the year it was created by TDF, Cognacq-Jay Image has been offering broadcasting services to major French TV channels. It also provides headend services and media preparation for Catchup TV and VOD platforms.
- PSN was established in Poland by TDF in 1994, initially as a terrestrial broadcast network operator for the Polish public and commercial radio channels. PSN also offers multimedia services based on the group solutions like OVP or CDN, ensuring additional shooting and postproduction services.
- Qbrick was a Stockholm-based company with offices in Denmark, Norway, Finland and Spain, created in 1999. It developed its own OVP platform, a SaaS solution for managing and delivering video content with features such as analytics, monetization and transcoding. Along with its CDN services, Qbrick is serving more than 700 media, telecom and corporate customers. It was acquired by TDF in October 2011.
- SmartJog has been offering global exchange and cloud storage services for digital media assets since 2002. Initially dedicated to the movie industry (studios, post-production houses, right-holders, TV channels and cinemas...), SmartJog extended its activity with a CDN dedicated to audiovisual media. It is part of the TDF group since November 2006.

In January 2014, the four companies dropped their name and merged their organisation, products and services. From this date, they all operate under the brand name Arkena.

== Organisation ==
=== Management ===
Julien Seligmann, one of SmartJog's founders was in charge of the Media Services division of TDF since 2011. and had been, until 2015, Arkena CEO
