= List of fellows of IEEE Power & Energy Society =

In the Institute of Electrical and Electronics Engineers, a small number of members are designated as fellows for having made significant accomplishments to the field. The IEEE Fellows are grouped by the institute according to their membership in the member societies of the institute. This list is of IEEE Fellows from the IEEE Power & Energy Society (IEEE PES).

Year	Fellow	Citation
1972	Lionel Barthold	For contributions to EHV and UHV technology.
1995	Joseph Appelbaum	For contributions to solar conversion systems.
1996	Hirofumi Akagi	For contributions to the theory of instantaneous reactive power in three-phase circuits, and to the development of active power filters for harmonic compensation in power systems
1996	Leszek S. Czarnecki	For development of the power theory of three-phase asymmetrical systems with nonsinusoidal waveforms, and for contributions to methods of measurements, power factor and power quality improvement in such systems
1999	Marija D. Ilić	For contributions to hierarchical electric power systems control and applications
2000	Maria Teresa Correia de Barros	For contribution to modeling and analysis of power systems transients
2001	Bozenna Pasik-Duncan	For contributions to identification and stochastic adaptive control
2002	Anuradha Annaswamy	For contributions to adaptive control theory, neural networks, and active-adaptive control of combustion systems.
2004	Yilu Liu	For contributions to modeling and diagnostic techniques for power equipment
2005	Elham Makram	For contributions to power engineering education and career development
2007	Ross Baldick	For contributions to analysis of power system economics
2008	Jinyun Zhang	For contributions to broadband wireless
2010	Mariesa Crow	For contributions to power engineering education and to computational methods for power system analysis
2010	María Inés Valla	For contributions to non-linear control of electric drives
2011	Anna Scaglione	For contributions to filterbank precoding for wireless transmission and signal processing for cooperative sensor networks
2012	Rambabu Adapa	For leadership in DC and flexible AC transmission systems
2012	George William Arnold	For leadership in architecture and protocols for the electric grid and telecommunication networks
2012	Wanda Reder	For leadership in power engineering implementation and workforce development
2013	Valerie Taylor	For contributions to performance enhancement of parallel computing applications
2014	Poras Balsara	For contributions to the design of all-digital frequency synthesis
2014	Carl Benner	For contributions to development of waveform-based analytics for electric power distribution
2014	Andrew Ott	For leadership in the design, development, and operation of competitive wholesale electricity markets
2014	Solveig Ward	For contributions to power system protective relaying, communications systems, and tele-protection transmission and networking technology
2015	Héctor Altuve Ferrer	For contributions to power line and transformer protection
2015	Anastasios Bakirtzis	For contributions to optimization of power systems operation and scheduling
2015	Alberto Borghetti	For contributions to modeling of power distribution systems under transient conditions
2015	Ming Cheng	For contributions to the development and control of stator permanent magnet machines for vehicular propulsion and wind power generation
2015	Chandan Chakraborty	For contributions to estimation techniques and control of induction machine and drive systems
2015	Javier Contreras	For contributions to modeling and forecasting of electricity markets
2015	Edward Dobrowolski	For leadership in interactive control center technology
2015	Babak Fahimi	For contributions to modeling and analysis of AC adjustable speed motor drives
2015	Manimaran Govindarasu	For contributions to security of power grids
2015	Yi Hu	For leadership in wide-area synchronized measurement systems
2015	James Jodice	For contributions to the testing of protective relays
2015	Deepa Kundur	For contributions to signal processing techniques for multimedia and cyber security
2015	David Lubkeman	For contributions to power system distribution systems
2015	Luis Marti	For contributions to modeling and simulation of electromagnetic transients
2015	Paolo Mattavelli	For contributions to power converters for grid-connected applications and power management
2015	Stephen McArthur	For contributions to intelligent systems with application in power engineering
2015	Shengwei Mei	For contributions to power systems robust control and complexity analysis
2015	Stefan Mozar	For development of safety solutions for electronic equipment
2015	Philip Overholt	For leadership in the development and deployment of synchrophasor technology
2015	Rasheek Rifaat	For contributions to protection of industrial power systems
2015	Surya Santoso	For contributions in automated root cause analysis of electric power quality disturbance phenomena
2015	Jian Sun	For contributions to modeling and control of power electronic circuits and systems
2015	Rajeev Thottappillil	For contributions to the understanding of lightning and electromagnetic interference
2015	Vaithianathan Venkatasubramanian	For contributions to on-line detection of oscillatory behavior of electric power systems
2016	Massoud Amin	For leadership in smart grids and security of critical infrastructures.
2016	Daniel Sabin	For leadership in power quality database management and analysis software.
2016	Noel Schulz	For leadership in advancing women in engineering and electric ship technologies
2017	G. Bhuvaneswari	For contributions to design and development of enhanced power quality converters.
2017	Hulya Kirkici	For contributions to high frequency, high field dielectric breakdown and electrical insulation for space and aerospace power systems
2018	Karen Butler-Purry	For contributions to expanding minority participation in power systems education
2018	Noriko Kawakami	For contributions to large-capacity power converters and applications
2019	Jonathan Sykes	For leadership in the application and management of reliable protection systems for electric power networks
2019	Joydeep Mitra	For contributions to the development of power system reliability methods
2019	Mary Ellen Randall	For leadership in the development and commercialization of audio-video decoders
2021	Ning Lu	For contributions to load modeling and control methods for providing demand side grid services
2021	Leila Parsa	For contributions to control of multi-phase permanent magnet motor drives
2021	Jacquelien Scherpen	For contributions to nonlinear model reduction and passivity-based control
2021	Eve Schooler	For contributions to multimedia protocols and internet standards
2022	Tianshu Bi	For contributions to synchrophasor technology and protective relay applications
2022	João Catalão	For contributions to power system operations and demand response
2022	Sarah Kurtz	For contributions to photovoltaic devices and systems reliability
2023	Yonghong Chen	For contributions in wholesale electricity market design and operations
2023	Marta Molinas	For contributions to modeling and stability of power electronics
2024	Hong Chen	For contributions to economic efficiency equilibrium and risk mitigation in power system operations
2024	Li Qi	For contributions to DC distribution protection and architectures of DC shipboard power systems
2024	Veronika Rabl	For contributions to the design of demand response resources and electrification
2024	Maria Cristina Tavares	For contributions to single-phase and three-phase auto-reclosing switching of transmission lines
2025	Jessica Bian	For leadership and contributions in electric power system reliability performance metrics, and for advancement of power flow modeling and control
2025	Chunxia Dou	For contributions to power system control and industrial applications
2025	Debra Lew	For contributions to grid integration of wind and solar power
2025	Sukumar Mishra	For contributions to microgrid control and smart charging technologies
2026	Jing Liang	For contributions to evolutionary computation for complex optimization and its real-world applications
2026	Xiaodong Liang	For contributions to protection of power systems and analysis of electrical submersible pump systems
2026	Poorvi Patel	For leadership in monitoring, diagnostics and standards for power transformers
2026	Somayeh Sojoudi	For contributions to optimization and learning techniques for complex systems
2026	Lina Bertling Tjernberg	For contributions to predictive maintenance models for power system reliability

== See also ==
- List of IEEE Fellows
