= Li Qi =

Li Qi is the name of:

== Historic figures ==
- Li Qi (emperor) (314–338), during the Sixteen Kingdoms period
- Li Qi (poet) (690–751), in the Tang dynasty
- Li Qi (military governor) (741–807), in the Tang dynasty
- Li Xi (Tang dynasty) or Li Qi (died 895), an official and briefly chancellor
- Li Qi (Five Dynasties) (871–930), an official and chancellor
- Li Qi (Yuan dynasty) (1301–1353), a politician
- Li Qi (Ming dynasty), son of Li Shanchang

== People's Republic of China ==
- Li Qi (softball) (born 1983), Chinese softball player
- Li Qi (ethicist) (1913–2009), Chinese ethicist
- Li Qi (politician, born 1914), previously referred to as Shen Naiting, from Shanxi
- Li Qi (politician, born 1918), previously referred to as Li Shangqi, from Zhili
- Li Qi (politician, born 1969), from Yunnan
- Li Qi (soldier) (1960–1979), Chinese soldier
- Li Qi (engineer), professor at Xi'an Jiaotong University

== See also ==
- Liqi Subdistrict, in Hongta District, Yuxi, Yunnan, China
