= Chanan Singh =

Indian-American electrical engineer

Chanan Singh is an Indian-American electrical engineer and University Distinguished Professor in the department of electrical and computer engineering, Texas A&M University. He was named Irma Runyon Chair Professor and Texas A&M System Regents Professor.

== Education ==
Singh got his M.S. and Ph.D. in electrical engineering from the University of Saskatchewan, Canada and B.Sc. (Gold Medalist) from the Punjab Engineering College, Chandigarh, India.

== Career ==
From 1997 to 2005 he served as the department head of electrical and computer engineering at Texas A&M and later, from 2012 to 2015, he served as interim head. He has held a position as a guest professor at Tsinghua University, Beijing, China. He has also served as program director at the National Science Foundation of US. He is also a principal and Vice-President of Associated Power Analysts Inc. a firm that specializes in developing software and conducting reliability studies of the electric power grid. Before joining Texas A&M University he worked in the R&D Division of Ontario Ministry of Transportation and Communications on the development of innovative public transit systems. Earlier, he had worked in the Punjab State Electricity Board and Indian Railways.

Singh is known for his contributions to electric power system reliability evaluation, particularly in developing the theoretical foundations for frequency and duration methods, non-Markovian models, modeling of interconnected power systems, integration of renewable resources and machine learning methods for reliability analysis of large electric power systems. He is author/co-author of five books, several book chapters, and over 400 technical articles.

== Major awards and recognition ==
- 2022 IEEE Power Engineering Society Lifetime Achievement Award for his contributions to the education, research and industrial adoption of reliability theory and practice in large power systems.
- 2020 Elected to Foreign Fellow of Indian National Academy of Engineering.
- 2020 Elected Foreign Fellow of Chinese Society of Electrical Engineering.
- 2018 Elected a member of the National Academy of Engineering for "advancement of theory, practice, and education in electric power system reliability"
- 2010 Inaugural recipient of the Roy Billinton Power System Reliability Award from the Power & Energy Society (PES) of the Institute of Electrical and Electronics Engineers (IEEE).
- 2008 Merit Award by the PMAPS International Society for lifelong achievements.
- 1998 Recipient of the 1998 Outstanding Power Engineering Educator Award given by the IEEE-PES.
- 1997 Awarded a D.Sc. degree by the University of Saskatchewan, Saskatoon, SK, Canada.
- 1991 Elected a Fellow of the IEEE for "contributions to theory and applications of quantitative reliability methods in electric power systems".

== Major publications ==
- Textbook: Power System Flexibility,( Zongxiang Lu, Haibo Li, Ying Qiao, Le Xie and Chanan Singh, Elsevier, 2023)
- Textbook: Electric Power Grid Reliability Evaluation: Models and Methods (Chanan Singh, Panida Jirutitijaroen and Joydeep Mitra; Wiley-IEEE Press, 2019; ISBN 978-1119486275)
- Textbook: Wind Power Systems: Applications of Computational Intelligence, (L. Wang, C.Singh, A. Kusiak, (Eds), Springer, Heidelberg, 2010.)
- Textbook: Engineering Reliability: New Techniques and Applications (Balbir S. Dhillon and Chanan Singh; Wiley, 1981; ISBN 978-0471050148)
- Textbook: System Reliability Modelling and Evaluation (Chanan Singh and Roy Billinton; Hutchinson, 1977; ISBN 978-0091265007)

== See also ==
- Roy Billinton
- Joydeep Mitra
