= Qizhou =

Qizhou may refer to:

== Modern locations ==
- Qizhou, Qichun County (蕲州), a town in Qichun County, Hubei, China, named after the historical prefecture
- Qizhou, Hebei (祁州), a town in Anguo, Hebei, China, named after the historical prefecture

== Historical locations ==
- Qizhou (modern Hubei) (蘄州), a prefecture between the 6th and 20th centuries in modern Hubei, China
- Qizhou (modern Hebei) (祁州), a prefecture between the 9th and 20th centuries in modern Hebei, China
- Qizhou (modern Shandong) (齊州), a prefecture between the 5th and 12th centuries in modern Shandong, China
- Qizhou (modern Shaanxi) (歧州), a prefecture between the 5th and 8th centuries in modern Shaanxi, China
- Qizhou (modern Liaoning) (祺州), a prefecture between the 10th and 12th centuries in modern Liaoning, China

== See also ==
- Qi (disambiguation)
