= Maria Tavares =

Maria Tavares may refer to:

- Maria Tavares (artist) (born 1965), Portuguese artist and art teacher
- Maria Cristina Tavares, Brazilian electrical engineer
- Maria Odeth Tavares (born 1976), Angolan handball goalkeeper
- Maria Leonor Tavares (born 1985), French-born Portuguese pole vaulter
- Maria Hermínia Tavares de Almeida, Brazilian political scientist
- Maria da Conceição Tavares, Portuguese naturalized Brazilian economist
