= Shifo =

Shifo (石佛, lit. stone Buddha) may refer to the following places in China:

== Towns ==
- Shifo, Shandong
- Shifo, Gansu
- Shifo, Henan, Zhongyuan District, Henan
- Shifo, Hebei, a town in Anguo, Hebei

== Townships ==
- Shifo Township, Zhejiang, a township in Longyou County, Zhejiang
