= Rabl =

Rabl may refer to:

- Rabl (company), a former Israeli chocolate and sweets manufacturer
- Revolutionary Anarchist Bowling League, a Minnesota defunct anarchist group
- Carl Rabl (1853–1917), Austrian anatomist and pioneer of cell cycle studies
- Rudolf Rabl (1889–1951), Czech-Jewish lawyer
- Veronika Rabl (born 1945), Czech-American power engineer
- Walter Rabl (1873–1940), Viennese composer and conductor

== See also ==
- RABL6, a gene that encodes human Rab-like protein 6
