= Jodice =

Jodice is a surname. Notable people with the surname include:

- James Jodice, American engineer
- Mimmo Jodice (1934–2025), Italian photographer
- Ralph Jodice (born 1955), US Air Force general

== See also ==
- Jodie
