= Adapa (surname) =

Adapa (Telugu: అడప) is a Telugu and Tulu Bunt surname. Notable people with the surname include:

- Rambabu Adapa, American engineer
- Shashidhar Adapa (born 1955), Indian production designer, set designer and puppet designer
