= Rambabu =

Ram babu or Ram Babu is an Indian given name:

- Khanuparude (Rambabu Prasai), Nepalese politician
- Cameraman Gangatho Rambabu, a 2012 Telugu film
- Rambabu Kodali, present Director of the National Institute of Technology Jamshedpur, India
- A. G. S. Ram Babu, Indian politician and former Member of Parliament elected from Tamil Nadu.
- Rambabu Adapa, American electrical engineer
