= Ross Baldick =

American academic

Ross Baldick is an American professor emeritus of electrical and computer engineering at the University of Texas at Austin. He is an Institute of Electrical and Electronics Engineers (IEEE) fellow of power and energy society. He is the chairman of the System Economics Sub-Committee of the IEEE Power Engineering and an associate editor of IEEE Transactions on Power Systems.

His research interests are optimization and economic theory application to electric power system operations, public policy, and technical issues related to electric transmission under deregulation.

== Education and career ==
He received his bachelor of science in mathematics and physics and bachelor of engineering in electrical engineering from the University of Sydney, Australia in 1983 and 1985, respectively. He received his Master of Science and Doctor of Philosophy in electrical engineering and computer sciences from University of California, Berkeley in 1988 and 1990, respectively. From 1991-1992, after completing his doctoral studies, he worked as a post-doctoral fellow at the Lawrence Berkeley National Laboratory. From 1992 to 1993, he was an assistant professor at Worcester Polytechnic Institute, Worcester, MA. In 1993, Baldick joined the University of Texas at Austin faculty, where he remained until his retirement in 2021.

== Research ==
Baldick's research interests in electric power span across multiple areas, and he has contributed to over one hundred peer-reviewed journal articles.

Baldick's research focuses on optimization and economic theory applied to electric power system operations and the public policy and technical issues associated with electric transmission under deregulation. He is the author of the textbook "Applied Optimization: Formulation and Algorithms for Engineering Systems."

== Honors and awards ==
In 2008, Baldick was named an IEEE Fellow for his contributions to analyzing and optimizing electric power systems.

Baldick has received the 2014 IEEE Power and Energy Society Outstanding Engineering Educator Award.

== Selected publications ==
- Calero, Ivan; Canizares, Claudio; Bhattacharya, Kankar; Baldick, Ross (17 July 2022). "Duck-curve Mitigation in Power Grids with High Penetration of PV Generation". 2022 IEEE Power & Energy Society General Meeting (PESGM). p. 1. doi:10.1109/PESGM48719.2022.9916812. ISBN 978-1-6654-0823-3. S2CID 253186682.
- Garcia, Manuel; Baldick, Ross (July 2022). "Requirements for Interdependent Reserve Types Providing Primary Frequency Control". 2022 IEEE Power & Energy Society General Meeting (PESGM). p. 1. doi:10.1109/PESGM48719.2022.9916788. ISBN 978-1-6654-0823-3. OSTI 2004107. S2CID 253186168.
- Ghesmati, Arezou; Huang, Bing; Chen, Yonghong; Baldick, Ross (July 2022). "Probabilistic Real-time Price Forecast and the Application to Pumped Storage Hydro Unit Optimization". 2022 IEEE Power & Energy Society General Meeting (PESGM). pp. 1–5. doi:10.1109/PESGM48719.2022.9917060. ISBN 978-1-6654-0823-3. S2CID 253186017.
- Zhang, Haixiang; Park, SangWoo; Lavaei, Javad; Baldick, Ross (March 2022). "Uniqueness of Power Flow Solutions Using Graph-Theoretic Notions". IEEE Transactions on Control of Network Systems. 9 (1): 100–112. Bibcode:2022ITCNS...9..100Z. doi:10.1109/TCNS.2022.3145749. ISSN 2325-5870. S2CID 228082887.
- Chen, Yonghong; Baldick, Ross (September 2022). "Battery Storage Formulation and Impact on Day Ahead Security Constrained Unit Commitment". IEEE Transactions on Power Systems. 37 (5): 3995–4005. Bibcode:2022ITPSy..37.3995C. doi:10.1109/TPWRS.2022.3144241. ISSN 1558-0679. S2CID 237239587.
- Varawala, Lamia; Hesamzadeh, Mohammad Reza; Dán, Gyorgy; Baldick, Ross (March 2022). "A Scalable Formulation for Look-Ahead Security-Constrained Optimal Power Flow". IEEE Transactions on Control of Network Systems. 9 (1): 138–150. Bibcode:2022ITCNS...9..138V. doi:10.1109/TCNS.2022.3140711. ISSN 2325-5870. S2CID 245793872.
- Verma, Pranjal Pragya; Hesamzadeh, Mohammad Reza; Baldick, Ross; Biggar, Darryl Ross; Swarup, Kesanakurthy Shanti; Srinivasan, Dipti (September 2022). "Bayesian Nash Equilibrium in Electricity Spot Markets: An Affine-Plane Approximation Approach". IEEE Transactions on Control of Network Systems. 9 (3): 1421–1434. Bibcode:2022ITCNS...9.1421V. doi:10.1109/TCNS.2021.3128510. ISSN 2325-5870. S2CID 244283338.
- Calero, Ivan; Cañizares, Claudio A.; Bhattacharya, Kankar; Baldick, Ross (January 2022). "Duck-Curve Mitigation in Power Grids With High Penetration of PV Generation". IEEE Transactions on Smart Grid. 13 (1): 314–329. Bibcode:2022ITSG...13..314C. doi:10.1109/TSG.2021.3122398. ISSN 1949-3061. S2CID 239917712.
- Huang, Bing; Chen, Yonghong; Baldick, Ross (January 2022). "A Configuration Based Pumped Storage Hydro Model in the MISO Day-Ahead Market". IEEE Transactions on Power Systems. 37 (1): 132–141. arXiv:2009.04944. Bibcode:2022ITPSy..37..132H. doi:10.1109/TPWRS.2021.3097270. ISSN 1558-0679. S2CID 221586062.
- Garcia, Manuel; Baldick, Ross (January 2022). "Requirements for Interdependent Reserve Types Providing Primary Frequency Control". IEEE Transactions on Power Systems. 37 (1): 51–64. Bibcode:2022ITPSy..37...51G. doi:10.1109/TPWRS.2021.3094214. ISSN 1558-0679. S2CID 237764692.
- Liu, Yikui; Wu, Lei; Yang, Yafei; Chen, Yonghong; Baldick, Ross; Bo, Rui (November 2021). "Secured Reserve Scheduling of Pumped-Storage Hydropower Plants in ISO Day-Ahead Market". IEEE Transactions on Power Systems. 36 (6): 5722–5733. Bibcode:2021ITPSy..36.5722L. doi:10.1109/TPWRS.2021.3077588. ISSN 1558-0679. OSTI 1826004. S2CID 235568194.
