= Li Qi (Yuan dynasty) =

Li Qi (1301–1353, Chinese: 李齐), originally from Puyin, Qizhou (now Anguo City, Hebei Province), was a political figure during the Yuan Dynasty.

== Biography ==
In 1333, Li Qi received the designation of Scholar of the Left Ranking (Chinese: 左榜状元). He held the positions of governor of Gaoyou and minister of Henan Huaixi Lianxiangsi. In 1350, burglars abruptly infiltrated the prefecture's post station and absconded with 12 horses. Li Qi pursued and eliminated them. In 1351, Qin Guanbao manufactured military weapons and attempted to engage in robbery and plunder. He was apprehended and executed by Li Qi. In 1353, Zhang Shicheng instigated a rebellion and besieged the city of Taizhou. Li Qi was dispatched by Henan Province to negotiate peace, but was thwarted by Zhang Shicheng. Following the conquest of Gaoyou by Zhang Shicheng's forces, Li Qi was slain.
