= Javier Contreras =

Javier Contreras may refer to:

- Javier Contreras (engineer)
- Javier Contreras (tennis)
