= Qi (disambiguation) =

Qi is a vital force forming part of any living entity in traditional Chinese culture.

Qi, QI or Q.I. may also refer to:

- QI, an initialism for a British comedy panel game television quiz show

== Arts and entertainment ==
- QI (Czech TV series)
- QI (Dutch TV series)
- "Q.I" (song), 2005, by Mylène Farmer
- QI: The Quest for Intelligence, a 2001 book by Kevin Warwick

== Businesses and brands ==
- Qi Card, an Iraqi payment card
- Quite Interesting Limited, research company for the QI TV show
- Ibom Air, a Nigerian airline (IATA:QI)
- Qimonda, German memory manufacturer (2006–2011; NYSE:QI)

== People ==
- Qi (surname), the romanization of several Chinese family names
- Qi of Xia (reigned 2146–2117 BC), a Chinese king of the Xia Dynasty
- Hou Ji, or Qi, a legendary Chinese culture hero

== Places in China ==
- Banners of Inner Mongolia (Chinese: 旗; pinyin: qí), an administrative division of the Inner Mongolia Autonomous Region in China.

=== Administrative areas ===
- Qi County, Kaifeng (杞县), Henan
- Qi County, Hebi (淇县), Henan
- Qi County, Shanxi (祁县), Jinzhong

=== Defunct states ===
- Qi (Henan) (杞; 16th century–445 BC), a minor feudal state
- Qi (state) (齊; 1046–221 BC), of the Zhou dynasty era
- Qi Kingdom (Han dynasty) (齊; 206–110 BC)
- Southern Qi (齊; 479–502)
- Northern Qi (齊; 550–577)
- Qi (齊; 881–884), a realm of Huang Chao during the late Tang dynasty
- Qi (Li Maozhen's state) (岐; 907–924), during the Five Dynasties and Ten Kingdoms period
- Qi (齊; 937–939), Southern Tang during the Five Dynasties and Ten Kingdoms period
- Liu Qi (大齊; 1130–1138), a puppet state ruled by Liu Yu during the Jin dynasty

== Science and technology ==
- Qi (standard), a wireless charging interface specification
- Qi Hardware, an open-hardware project
- ATCvet code QI Immunologicals, a section of the Anatomical Therapeutic Chemical Classification System for veterinary medicinal products
- QueryInterface, in Microsoft's COM software
- Quote Investigator, a fact-checking website

== Other uses ==
- Qualified immunity, a legal doctrine in United States federal law
- Quality indicator, a type of performance measurement
- Quality improvement, which is also known as quality management
- Queen's Island, place in Belfast, Northern Ireland
  - Queen's Island F.C.
  - Queen's Island F.C. (1881)

== See also ==
- KI (disambiguation)
- Key (disambiguation)
- Chi (disambiguation)
- Qizhou (disambiguation)
- Queer Eye (disambiguation)
- Quality Management
