= Venkatasubramanian =

Venkatasubramanian is an Indian surname. Notable people with the surname include:

- Ganesan Venkatasubramanian, Indian psychiatrist
- Nalini Venkatasubramanian, Indian-American professor
- Suresh Venkatasubramanian, Indian-American computer scientist
- Vaithianathan Venkatasubramanian, Indian-American electrical engineer
- Venkat Venkatasubramanian, Indian-American engineer
