= Molinas =

Molinas is a Spanish surname meaning "mills". Notable people with this name include:

- Jack Molinas (1931–1975), American basketball player
- Luciano Molinas (1888–1973), Argentine politician
- Marta Molinas (born 1968), Paraguayan and Norwegian electrical engineer
- Nicanor Molinas (1823–1892), Argentine lawyer
- Osmar Molinas (born 1987), Paraguayan footballer
