= Jessica Bian =

Chinese-American energy executive

Jessica J. Bian (also published as Jinhua Bian) is a Chinese and American energy executive, the former president of the IEEE Power & Energy Society.

== Education and career ==
Bian is the daughter of two electrical power engineers. She studied electrical engineering at the Taiyuan University of Technology, receiving a bachelor's degree in 1985. After a 1988 master's degree through the China Electric Power Research Institute, she completed her Ph.D. at Tulane University in 1992. Her dissertation, Modal analysis of large-scale power systems' voltage stability and voltage collapse, was supervised by Parviz Rastgoufard.

She has worked for the Westinghouse Electric Corporation, PJM Interconnection, the Electric Reliability Council of Texas, Grid-X Partners, the North American Electric Reliability Corporation, and RAS Fusion, where she is chief technology officer.

She was president of the IEEE Power & Energy Society for the 2022–2023 term.

== Recognition ==
In 2014, Bian became the inaugural recipient of the IEEE Power & Energy Society Wanda Reder Pioneer in Power Award.

She was elected as an IEEE Fellow, in the 2025 class of fellows, "for contributions to bulk power system reliability improvement and advances in power flow". In the same year she was elected to the National Academy of Engineering, "for leadership and contributions in electric power system reliability performance metrics, and for advancement of power flow modeling and control".

In 2026 she was named as a distinguished visiting professor at Tsinghua University.
