= Xifoluo =

Xifoluo 西佛落镇
- Town
- Xifoluozhen
- Location in Hebei Xifoluo (China)
- Coordinates: 38°32′05.9″N 115°19′53.7″E
- Country: People's Republic of China
- Province: Hebei
- Prefecture-level city: Baoding
- County-level city: Anguo

Area
  - Total: 41.06 km^{2} (15.85 sq mi)

Population (2010)
  - Total: 22,030
  - Density: 536.5/km^{2} (1,390/sq mi)
- Time zone: UTC+8 (China Standard)
- Local dialing code: 312

Xifoluo (Chinese: 西佛落镇; pinyin: Xīfóluò zhèn) is a town in Anguo, Baoding, Hebei, China. In 2010, Xifoluo had a total population of 22,030: 11,126 males and 10,904 females: 3,494 aged under 14, 16,570 aged between 15 and 65, and 1,966 aged over 65.

== See also ==
- List of township-level divisions of Hebei
