= Elham Makram =

Electrical engineer

Elham Badie Makram is an electrical engineer and engineering educator specializing in power systems engineering. She is South Carolina Electric and Gas Distinguished Professor of Electrical and Computer Engineering Emerita in the Holcombe Department of Electrical and Computer Engineering at Clemson University, and the former director of the Clemson University Electric Power Research Association.

== Education and career ==
Makram graduated in 1961 from Assiut University in Egypt. After working as an engineer in Egypt, she came to Iowa State University for graduate study, earning a master's degree in 1978 and completing her Ph.D. in 1981. Her dissertation was Digital modeling of power systems for fault transient studies; she was the first woman to complete a Ph.D. in electrical engineering at Iowa State.

She worked for two more years in industry, for Siemens–Allis in North Carolina, before returning to academia as an assistant professor at North Carolina A&T State University in 1983. After moving to Clemson, she was named South Carolina Electric and Gas Distinguished Professor of Electrical and Computer Engineering in 1998.

She retired in 2016; her position as South Carolina Electric and Gas Distinguished Professor was taken up by Sukumar Brahma, a former student of Makram's husband Adly Girgis.

== Recognition ==
The Society of Women Engineers gave Makram their Distinguished Engineering Educator Award in 1993. She was named a Fellow of the IEEE in 2005, "for contributions to power engineering education and career development", becoming the first female IEEE Fellow in power engineering. In 2014, the IEEE Power & Energy Society gave her an award recognizing her contributions to engineering education.

In 2012, Clemson gave her their Ralph D. Elliott Endowed Award for Outstanding Service to Off-Campus, Distance and Continuing Education. The Iowa State University Department of Electrical & Computer Engineering elected her to their hall of fame, in the inaugural 2019 class.
