= Dawunü =

Dawunü 大五女镇
- Town
- Dawunüzhen
- Location in Hebei Dawunü (China)
- Coordinates: 38°22′17.3″N 115°12′53.7″E
- Country: People's Republic of China
- Province: Hebei
- Prefecture-level city: Baoding
- County-level city: Anguo

Area
  - Total: 34.85 km^{2} (13.46 sq mi)

Population (2010)
  - Total: 23,979
  - Density: 688.1/km^{2} (1,782/sq mi)
- Time zone: UTC+8 (China Standard)
- Local dialing code: 312

Dawunü (Chinese: 大五女镇; pinyin: Dàwǔnǚ zhèn) is a town in Anguo, Baoding, Hebei, China. In 2010, Dawunü had a total population of 23,979: 12,002 males and 11,977 females: 3,616 aged under 14, 17,868 aged between 15 and 65, and 2,495 aged over 65.

== See also ==
- List of township-level divisions of Hebei
