= Vic Hayes =

Dutch electrical engineer, father of Wi-Fi

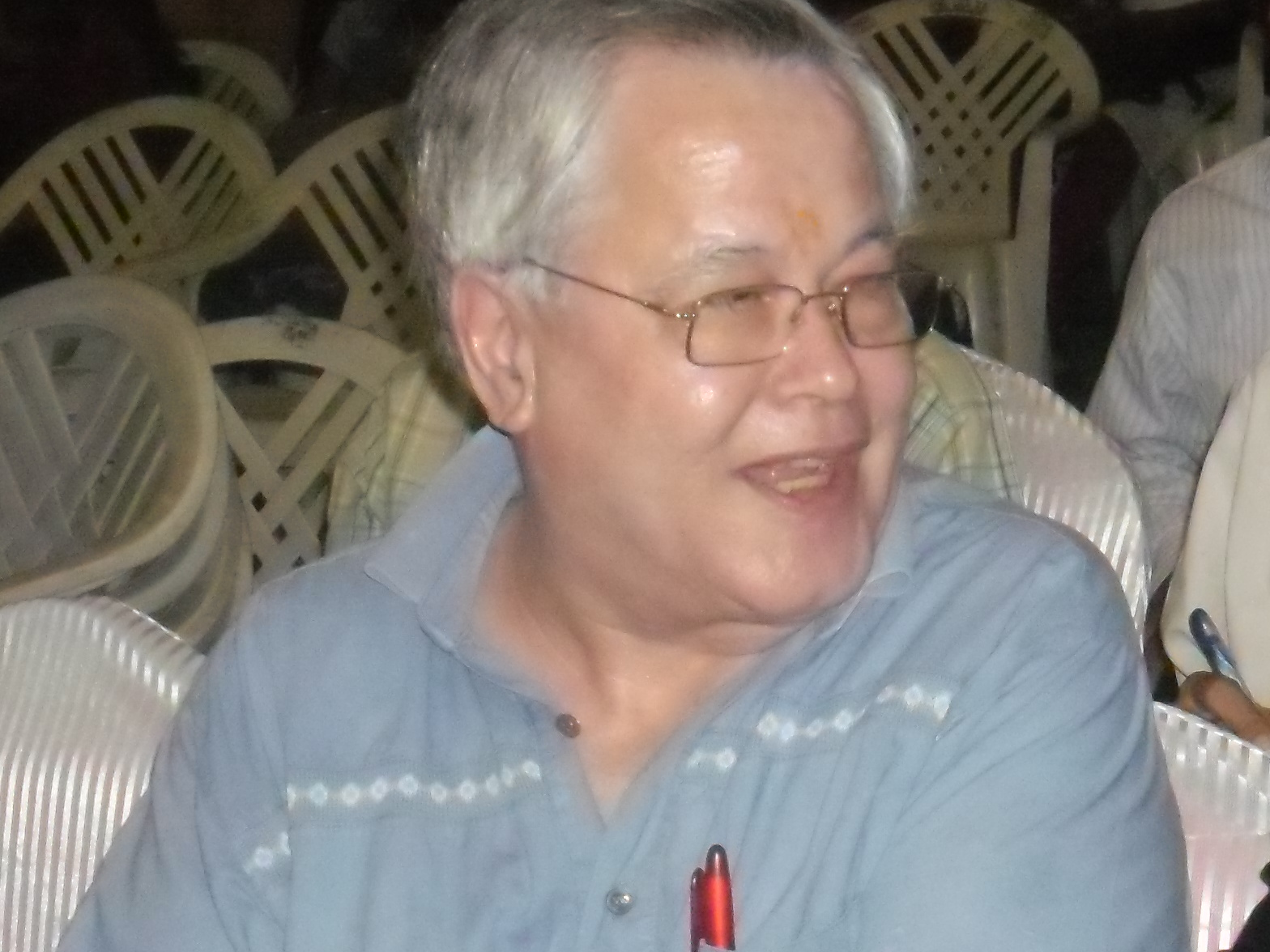
Vic Hayes at College of Engineering, Guindy

Victor "Vic" Hayes (born July 31, 1941 Surabaya, Dutch East Indies) is a former Senior Research Fellow at the Delft University of Technology. His role in establishing and chairing the IEEE 802.11 Standards Working Group for Wireless Local Area Networks has led to him being referred to by some as the "Father of Wi-Fi".

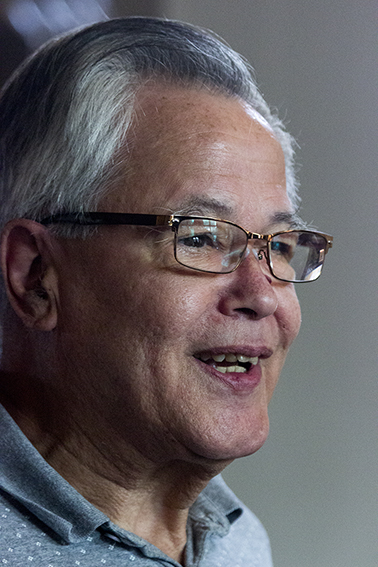
Vic Hayes on his 75th birthday

Hayes is a graduate of the Hogeschool van Amsterdam, where he studied electrical engineering.

== Awards and honors ==
He is the recipient of:

- 1998: IEEE Standards Association's Standards Medallion “for the internationalization of the IEEE 802.11 standard”.
- 2000: IEEE Leadership Award “for 10 years of leadership and extraordinary dedication as chairman of the IEEE 802.11 Wireless LAN Working Group”.
- 2001: IEEE Computer Society's Hans Karlsson Standards Award.
- 2002: Wi-Fi Alliance Leadership Award “in recognition of the outstanding leadership of the Regulatory Committee of the Wi-Fi Alliance”.
- 2003: Wi-Fi Alliance Leadership Award “for outstanding leadership as Regulatory Chair and continued support of the Wi-Fi Alliance”.
- 2004: Innovation Award in the category communications from The Economist.
- 2004: Vosko Trophy for Business and Innovation from Vosko Networking.
- 2007: IEEE Charles Proteus Steinmetz Award.
- 2012: George R. Stibitz Computer & Communications Pioneer Award
- 2013: IT Hall of Fame inductee
- 2013: Lovie Lifetime Achievement Award
- 2015: Included in the Consumer Electronics Hall of Fame.
- 2021: Honorary degree from Simon Fraser University

== Publications ==
- License-exempt: Wi-Fi complement to 3G. W Lemstra, V Hayes - Telematics and Informatics, Volume 26, Issue 3, August 2009, Pages 227-239
- Licence-exempt: the emergence of Wi-Fi. V Hayes, W Lemstra - info, Volume 11, Issue 5, 2009, Pages 57 – 71

== Book contributions ==
- The IEEE 802.11 handbook: a designer's companion; Bob O'Hara, Al Petrick, 2004. Foreword by Vic Hayes. ISBN 0-7381-4449-5
- The Innovation Journey of Wi-Fi: The Road Toward Global Success; Wolter Lemstra, Vic Hayes, John Groenewegen (eds), 2010. ISBN 0-521-19971-9
