= Ning Lu =

Electrical engineer

Ning Lu is an American-Chinese electrical engineer who is currently professor of Electrical and Computer Engineering at North Carolina State University. Her research specializes in electric power systems, and in modeling, scheduling, and controlling the load profile in smart grids, including the demand response of grid friendly household appliances, energy storage, and the integration of renewable energy sources into the grid.

== Education and career ==
Lu studied electrical engineering at the Harbin Institute of Technology, graduating in 1993, and then worked for five years as a substation design engineer in Shenyang. Next, she went to the Rensselaer Polytechnic Institute for graduate study in electric power engineering, earning a master's degree in 1999 and completing her Ph.D. in 2002. Her dissertation, Power System Modeling Using Petri Nets, was jointly supervised by Alan Desrochers and Joe H. Chow.

She became a research engineer at the Pacific Northwest National Laboratory, working there from 2003 to 2012. In 2013 she returned to academia as an associate professor of electrical and computer engineering at North Carolina State University; she was promoted to full professor in 2019.

She has also chaired several committees of the IEEE Power & Energy Society, and was the president of the North American Chinese Power Professional Association from 2011 to 2013.

== Books ==
Lu is a coauthor of books including:

- Energy Storage for Smart Grids: Planning and Operation for Renewable and Variable Energy Resources (VERs) (with Pengwei Du, Academic Press, 2015)
- Demand Response in Smart Grids (with Pengwei Du and Haiwang Zhong, Springer, 2019)

== Recognition ==
Lu was named an IEEE Fellow in the 2021 class of fellows, "for contributions to load modeling and control methods for providing demand side grid services".
