= Jim McDonald (electrical engineer) =

British engineer and educator

Sir Jim McDonald KT GBE FRSE FREng FIET FInstP FEI
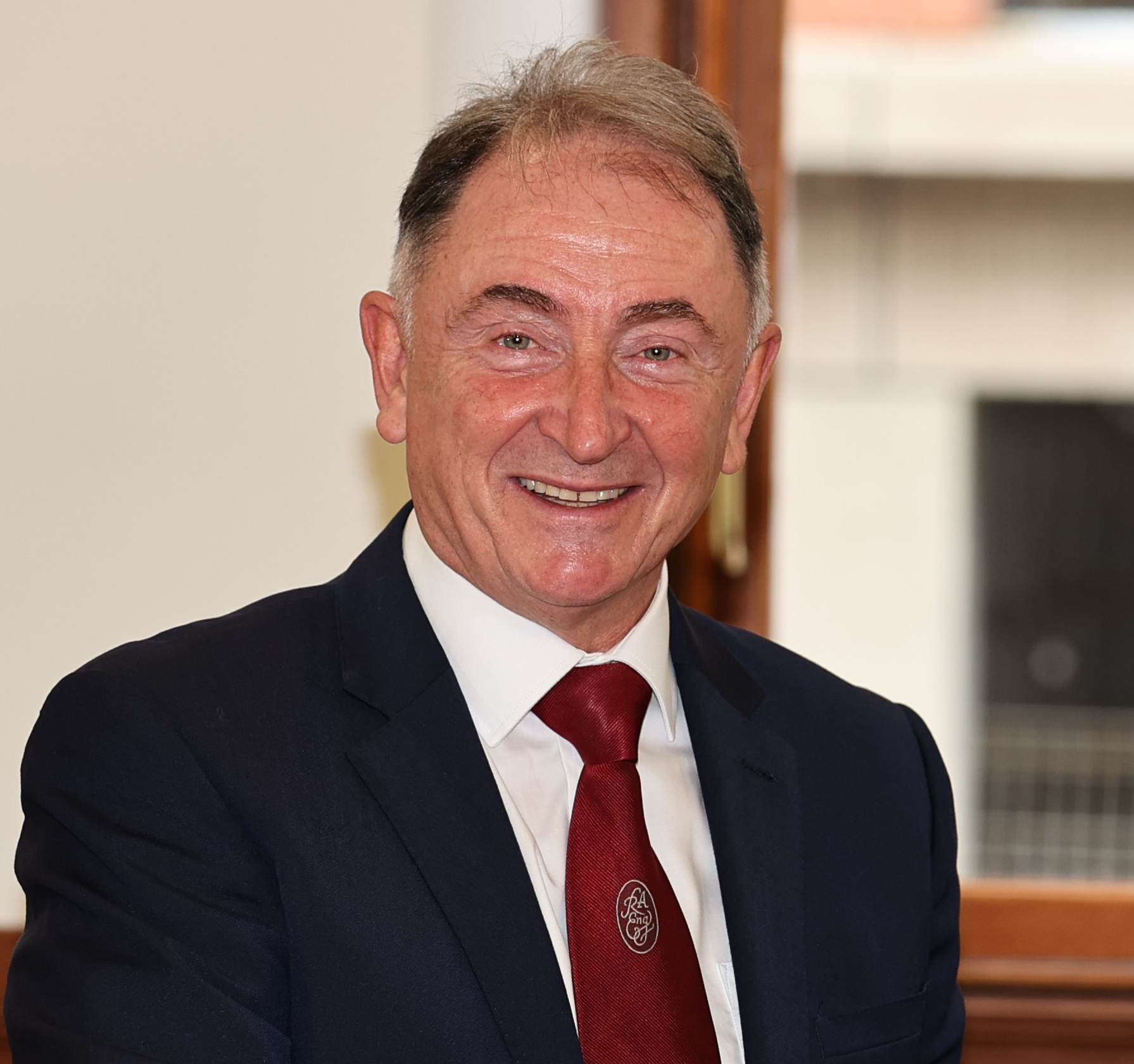
- McDonald in 2020

Principal and Vice Chancellor of the University of Strathclyde
- In office March 2009 – August 2025
- Preceded by: Andrew Hamnett
- Succeeded by: Stephen McArthur

Personal details
- Born: James Rufus McDonald; 1957 (age 68–69)
- Education: University of Strathclyde (BSc, MSc, PhD)

Sir James Rufus McDonald (born 1957) is a British engineer and educator, who served as principal and vice-chancellor of the University of Strathclyde from 2009 to 2025. He served as the president of the Royal Academy of Engineering between 2019 and 2024, and is also a visiting professor at NYU Tandon School of Engineering.

== Education ==
McDonald studied at the University of Strathclyde, where he obtained a BSc (Hons) degree in Electrical and Electronic Engineering in 1978, an MSc degree in Electrical Power Engineering in 1984, and a PhD degree in Power System Economics in 1990.

== Career ==
After seven years of work within the UK electricity supply industry, McDonald joined Strathclyde University in 1984 and became professor of electrical power systems in 1993. In 2006, he was appointed deputy principal responsible for research and was appointed as Principal and Vice-Chancellor of the University of Strathclyde in March 2009. He has co-authored more than 600 papers and three books.

On 15 February 2019, the Royal Academy of Engineering announced that its Trustee Board had nominated McDonald as its presidential candidate for election by Fellows at the September 2019 AGM. McDonald served a full five-year term, stepping down in 2024.

In October 2024, McDonald announced that he would retire from his role at Strathclyde in August 2025 after 16 years. He was succeeded by Professor Stephen McArthur.

In December 2024, the Scottish Government appointed McDonald as Chair of Scottish Enterprise for a period of three years.

In 2001, he was invited to deliver the MacMillan Memorial Lecture to the Institution of Engineers and Shipbuilders in Scotland. He chose the subject "Electric Propulsion in Marine Applications: An Electrical Engineer's Viewpoint".

McDonald delivered a TEDx talk at the 2021 Annual Ideas Conference organised by TEDxUniversity of Strathclyde under the theme "Resilience Reignited". During his TED talk, McDonald discussed a systems engineering approach to achieving net zero by 2050 which includes the use of steam reforming. "Net Zero" means not adding to the amount of greenhouse gases in the atmosphere – achieving this means reducing emissions as much as possible as well as balancing out those that remain by an equivalent amount

He highlighted the factors in energy which need to be taken in consideration if we are to achieve a decarbonised future – factors such as affordability, reliability, economic opportunity and public engagement. He spoke about the importance of leadership, policy making and resilient infrastructure in the goal towards creating a sustainable future.

== Honours and fellowships ==
McDonald was knighted in the 2012 Birthday Honours for services to education, engineering and the economy. He was appointed a Knight Grand Cross of the Order of the British Empire (GBE) in the 2024 New Year Honours for services to engineering, education and energy. He was made a Knight of the Order of the Thistle (KT) in June 2026.

He was elected a Fellow of the Royal Society of Edinburgh (FRSE) and a Fellow of the Royal Academy of Engineering (FREng), both in 2003, and is also a Fellow of the Institution of Engineering and Technology (FIET), the Institute of Physics (FInstP), and of the Energy Institute (FEI) in the United Kingdom. In addition, he is a Fellow of the Institute of Electrical and Electronics Engineers (FIEEE) in the United States.

McDonald has also been honoured by foreign institutions as an Honorary Fellow of the Irish Academy of Engineering, a Foreign Fellow of the Chinese Society for Electrical Engineering and an International Member of the US-based National Academy of Engineering.

He was inducted into the Scottish Engineering Hall of Fame in 2024.

Orders of precedence in the United Kingdom
Preceded by Sir Tony Blair	Gentlemen	Succeeded by Sir James MacMillan
