= Innocent Kamwa =

Canadian electrical engineer and academic

- Education: Université Laval
- Scientific career
- Workplaces: Université Laval
- Thesis: Contributions à la modélisation des machines synchrones et à leur identification optimale par des techniques de traitement de signal (1988)

Innocent Kamwa is a Canadian electrical engineer who is a professor and Tier 1 Canada Research Chair in Decentralised Sustainable Electricity Grids for Smart Communities at Université Laval. He was elected a Fellow of the National Academy of Engineering in 2022.

== Early life and education ==
Kamwa studied applied science at the Université Laval, where he studied electronic engineering. He stayed at Laval for his doctoral research, where he modelled synchronous machines.

== Research and career ==
Kamwa joined the Hydro-Québec Smart Grid Innovation program, where he spent 25 years. He has worked on improving power system stability, developing intelligent algorithms for application in industry. He developed Hydro-Quebec's first Multiband Power System Stabiliser. In 2021, he was made a Tier 1 Canada Research Chair, and became a full professor at the Université Laval.

== Awards and honours ==
- Elected Fellow of the Canadian Academy of Engineering
- 2005 Elected Fellow of the Institute of Electrical and Electronics Engineers (IEEE)
- 2019 IEEE Charles Proteus Steinmetz Award
- 2019 IEEE Charles Concordia Award
- 2022 Elected Fellow of the National Academy of Engineering

== Selected publications ==
- Andersson, G.; Donalek, P.; Farmer, R.; Hatziargyriou, N.; Kamwa, I.; Kundur, P.; Martins, N.; Paserba, J.; Pourbeik, P.; Sanchez-Gasca, J.; Schulz, R.; Stankovic, A.; Taylor, C.; Vittal, V. (November 2005). "Causes of the 2003 major grid blackouts in North America and Europe, and recommended means to improve system dynamic performance". IEEE Transactions on Power Systems. 20 (4): 1922–1928. Bibcode:2005ITPSy..20.1922A. doi:10.1109/TPWRS.2005.857942. ISSN 1558-0679. S2CID 44001094.
- Kamwa, I.; Grondin, R.; Hebert, Y. (February 2001). "Wide-area measurement based stabilizing control of large power systems-a decentralized/hierarchical approach". IEEE Transactions on Power Systems. 16 (1): 136–153. Bibcode:2001ITPSy..16..136K. doi:10.1109/59.910791. ISSN 1558-0679.
- Ghahremani, Esmaeil; Kamwa, Innocent (November 2011). "Dynamic State Estimation in Power System by Applying the Extended Kalman Filter With Unknown Inputs to Phasor Measurements". IEEE Transactions on Power Systems. 26 (4): 2556–2566. Bibcode:2011ITPSy..26.2556G. doi:10.1109/TPWRS.2011.2145396. ISSN 1558-0679. S2CID 37639566.
