= Nanloudi Township =

Nanloudi 南娄底乡
- Township
- Nanloudixiang
- Location in Hebei Nanloudi (China)
- Coordinates: 38°16′21.2″N 115°19′05.6″E
- Country: People's Republic of China
- Province: Hebei
- Prefecture-level city: Baoding
- County-level city: Anguo

Area
  - Total: 50.32 km^{2} (19.43 sq mi)

Population (2010)
  - Total: 34,362
  - Density: 682.9/km^{2} (1,769/sq mi)
- Time zone: UTC+8 (China Standard)
- Local dialing code: 312

Nanloudi (Chinese: 南娄底乡; pinyin: Nánlóudǐ xiāng) is a township in Anguo, Baoding, Hebei, China. In 2010, Nanloudi had a total population of 34,362: 17,262 males and 17,100 females: 6,232 aged under 14, 24,648 aged between 15 and 65, and 3,482 aged over 65.

== See also ==
- List of township-level divisions of Hebei
