= IEEE Charles Proteus Steinmetz Award =

- Awarded for: Exceptional contributions to the development and/or advancement of standards in electrical and electronics engineering
- Sponsored by: Institute of Electrical and Electronics Engineers
- First award: 1980
- Website: IEEE Charles Proteus Steinmetz Award

The IEEE Charles Proteus Steinmetz Award is a technical field award given to an individual by the Institute of Electrical and Electronics Engineers (IEEE) for major contributions to standardization within the field of electrical and electronics engineering. This IEEE-level award, which honors mathematician and pioneering electrical engineer Charles Proteus Steinmetz, was created in 1979 by the board of directors of the IEEE and sponsored by the IEEE Standards Association.

The award is given only to individual recipients (not groups or multiple individuals in a single year).

Recipients of this award receive a bronze medal, a certificate, and an honorarium.

== Recipients ==
The following people have received the IEEE Charles Proteus Steinmetz Award:

- 1980: Leon Podolsky
- 1981: No Award
- 1982: Ralph M. Showers
- 1983: William A. McAdams
- 1984: H. Baron Whitaker
- 1985: Charles L. Wagner
- 1986: Chester H. Page
- 1987: Bruce B. Barrow
- 1988: No Award
- 1989: Joseph L. Koepfinger
- 1990: Warren H. Cook
- 1991: Fletcher J. Buckley
- 1992: Donald C. Fleckenstein
- 1993: Ivan G. Easton
- 1994: Clayton H. Griffin
- 1995: L. Bruce McClung
- 1996: Marco W. Migliaro
- 1997: Donald N. Heirman
- 1997: L. John Rankine
- 1998: William J. McNutt
- 1999: Dennis Bodson
- 2000: Hiroshi Yasuda
- 2001: Stanley Baron
- 2002: Ben C. Johnson
- 2003: Donald C. Loughry
- 2004: Julian Forster
- 2005: Wallace S. Read
- 2006: Steven Mark Halpin
- 2007: Vic Hayes
- 2008: Roy Billinton
- 2009: James Thomas Carlo
- 2010: Richard Deblasio
- 2011: James W. Moore
- 2012: Daleep C. Mohla
- 2013: Mohindar Sachdev
- 2014: Mark Mcgranaghan
- 2015: Steven Mills
- 2016: Hermann Koch
- 2017: David John Law
- 2018: Craig M. Wellman
- 2019: Innocent Kamwa
- 2020: Solveig M. Ward
- 2021: Haran C. Karmaker
- 2022: Kenneth E. Martin
- 2023: Philip Wennblom
- 2024: Gary R. Hoffman
- 2025: Paul Nikolich
- 2026: Alexander D. Gelman
- 2027: Mehmet Ulema

== See also ==
- Charles P. Steinmetz Memorial Lecture
