= Stephen McArthur (engineer) =

British engineer and educator

Stephen McArthur FIET FRSE FIEEE

Principal and Vice Chancellor of the University of Strathclyde
- Incumbent
- Assumed office September 2025
- Preceded by: Jim McDonald

Personal details
- Education: University of Strathclyde (BEng, PhD)

Stephen McArthur is a British engineer and educator, specializing in AI, data science, and decision support for energy systems and smart grids. He currently serves as Principal and Vice Chancellor of the University of Strathclyde succeeding Professor Sir Jim McDonald in September 2025.

== Career ==
McArthur has spent his entire career with the University of Strathclyde. He holds Bachelors (1992) and PhD (1996) degrees. McArthur holds the position of Distinguished Professor of Intelligent Systems and his research focusses on the use of intelligence and data analytics for decision support, primarily in power systems. He has held a number of senior academic leadership roles, including Associate Principal and the Executive Dean of Engineering and interim President of the University of Strathclyde, Bahrain, prior to being appointed Principal and Vice Chancellor in September 2025.

He is also co-founder and Chief Technology Officer of Bellrock Technology, an AI and data analytics company and serves on the Board of Scottish Enterprise.

== Honours and fellowships ==
In recognition of his contributions to electrical power engineering McArthur was elected Fellow of the Institute of Electrical and Electronics Engineers in 2015, Fellow of the Royal Society of Edinburgh in 2025, and the Institution of Engineering and Technology.

He was awarded the 2021 IEEE Richard Harold Kaufmann Award for "innovative contributions to the advancement of intelligent systems for power engineering applications."
