= Mingguandian Township =

Mingguandian 明官店乡
- Township
- Mingguandianxiang
- Location in Hebei Mingguandian (China)
- Coordinates: 38°20′09.8″N 115°19′44.0″E
- Country: People's Republic of China
- Province: Hebei
- Prefecture-level city: Baoding
- County-level city: Anguo

Area
  - Total: 43.78 km^{2} (16.90 sq mi)

Population (2010)
  - Total: 29,825
  - Density: 681.2/km^{2} (1,764/sq mi)
- Time zone: UTC+8 (China Standard)
- Local dialing code: 312

Mingguandian (Chinese: 明官店乡; pinyin: Míngguāndiàn xiāng) is a township in Anguo, Baoding, Hebei, China. In 2010, Mingguandian had a total population of 29,825: 14,857 males and 14,968 females: 4,569 aged under 14, 22,143 aged between 15 and 65, and 3,113 aged over 65.

== See also ==
- List of township-level divisions of Hebei
