= Wurenqiao =

Wurenqiao 伍仁桥镇
- Town
- Wurenqiaozhen
- Location in Hebei Wurenqiao (China)
- Coordinates: 38°18′03.5″N 115°19′41.0″E
- Country: People's Republic of China
- Province: Hebei
- Prefecture-level city: Baoding
- County-level city: Anguo

Area
  - Total: 38.36 km^{2} (14.81 sq mi)

Population (2010)
  - Total: 30,912
  - Density: 805.8/km^{2} (2,087/sq mi)
- Time zone: UTC+8 (China Standard)
- Local dialing code: 312

Wurenqiao (Chinese: 伍仁桥镇; pinyin: Wǔrénqiáo zhèn) is a town in Anguo, Baoding, Hebei, China. In 2010, Wurenqiao had a total population of 30,912: 15,593 males and 15,319 females: 5,320 under 14 years, 22,522 between 15 and 65 years, and 3,070 over 65 years.

== See also ==
- List of township-level divisions of Hebei
