= Beiduancun Township =

Beiduancun 北段村乡
- Township
- Beiduancunxiang
- Location in Hebei Beiduancun (China)
- Coordinates: 38°28′14.8″N 115°17′49.0″E
- Country: People's Republic of China
- Province: Hebei
- Prefecture-level city: Baoding
- County-level city: Anguo

Area
  - Total: 38.53 km^{2} (14.88 sq mi)

Population (2010)
  - Total: 20,411
  - Density: 529.7/km^{2} (1,372/sq mi)
- Time zone: UTC+8 (China Standard)
- Local dialing code: 312

Beiduancun (Chinese: 北段村乡; pinyin: Běiduàncūn xiāng) is a township in Anguo, Baoding, Hebei, China. In 2010, Beiduancun had a total population of 20,411: 9,957 males and 10,454 females: 3,577 aged under 14, 14,986 aged between 15 and 65, and 1,848 aged over 65.

== See also ==
- List of township-level divisions of Hebei
