= Mo Menchuan =

Chinese politician and academic

Personal details
- Born: September 1939 (age 87) Anguo, Hebei, China
- Party: China National Democratic Construction Association
- Education: Peking University

Chinese name
- Simplified Chinese: 墨文川
Transcriptions
Standard Mandarin
- Hanyu Pinyin: Mò Ménchuān

Mo Menchuan is a Chinese politician and academician specialized in management science. He is known to have a close friendship with another prominent party member, Xu Wenyuan.

== Biography ==
He was born in Anguo, Hebei Province. He studied in Peking University and later joined China National Democratic Construction Association, a united front-affiliated political party. During his 2011 interview, his associates were puzzled at his decision of not joining the Chinese Communist Party and he explained that "the development of the country demands diversity". During his tenure as a university professor in Shandong University in 1988, he taught with Chen Zengjing, one of the prominent Chinese scholars in the field of mathematical finance. His academic career became a driving force for his political career.

With the capacity of being one of the vice-chairpersons of Shandong Provincial People's Congress in 1999, he chose an elementary school in Yinan County as the starting point for running a governmental program to eradicate poverty in the region. In December 2002, he attended the 8th National Congress of China National Democratic Construction Association that was held Beijing and he was elected as a member of the 8th Central Committee as well as becoming the Standing Committee member. This later facilitated his political activity as a member of the Chinese People's Political Consultative Conference.

He is the president of the Shandong provincial branch of Peking University's alumni association.

His times of teaching in tertiary educational institutions outside of China include:

- University of California, San Diego, United States (January 1980 — January 1982)
- Saint Vincent College in Latrobe, Pennsylvania, United States (1988 — 1989; January 1997 — May 1997; September 2002 — December 2002)

== Bibliography ==
- Mo, Menchuan (1989). 现代管理技术 [Modern Management Science] (in Chinese). 山东大学出版社. ISBN 978-7560701974.
