= Li Qi (politician, born 1969) =

Chinese politician (born 1969)

Li Qi (born July 1969, Chinese: 李琦) is a Chinese politician.

== Biography ==
Li Qi has served as deputy director and director of the office of the Yunnan Provincial Federation of Literature and Art; secretary-general of the Yunnan Provincial Federation of Literature and Art, chief leader of the village-based poverty alleviation task force in Gongshan County, and deputy secretary of the Gongshan County Party Committee. In December 2019, he was appointed as vice-chairman of the Federation of Literary and Art Circles of Yunnan Province. In 2023, he served as vice chairman of the Yunnan Federation of Trade Unions.
