= IEEE Power & Energy Magazine =

- Discipline: Electric power, power transmission, electric power transmission, electric power distribution
- Language: English
- Edited by: Melvin I. Olken

Publication details
- Former name: IEEE Power Engineering Review
- History: 2003-present
- Publisher: IEEE Power & Energy Society
- Frequency: Bimonthly
- Impact factor: 1.43 (2013)

Standard abbreviations
- ISO 4: IEEE Power Energy Mag.

Indexing
- ISSN: 1540-7977
- LCCN: 2002214486
- OCLC no.: 51775521

Links
- Journal homepage; Online access

The IEEE Power & Energy magazine (formerly IEEE Power Engineering Review, ISSN 0272-1724) is a magazine published by the IEEE Power & Energy Society. Feature articles focus on advanced concepts, technologies, and practices associated with all aspects of electric power from a technical perspective in synergy with nontechnical areas such as business, environmental, and social concerns.

The current editor is Melvin I. Olken, and the 2013 impact factor was 1.43.
