= Roy Billinton =

Canadian electrical engineer (1935–2025)

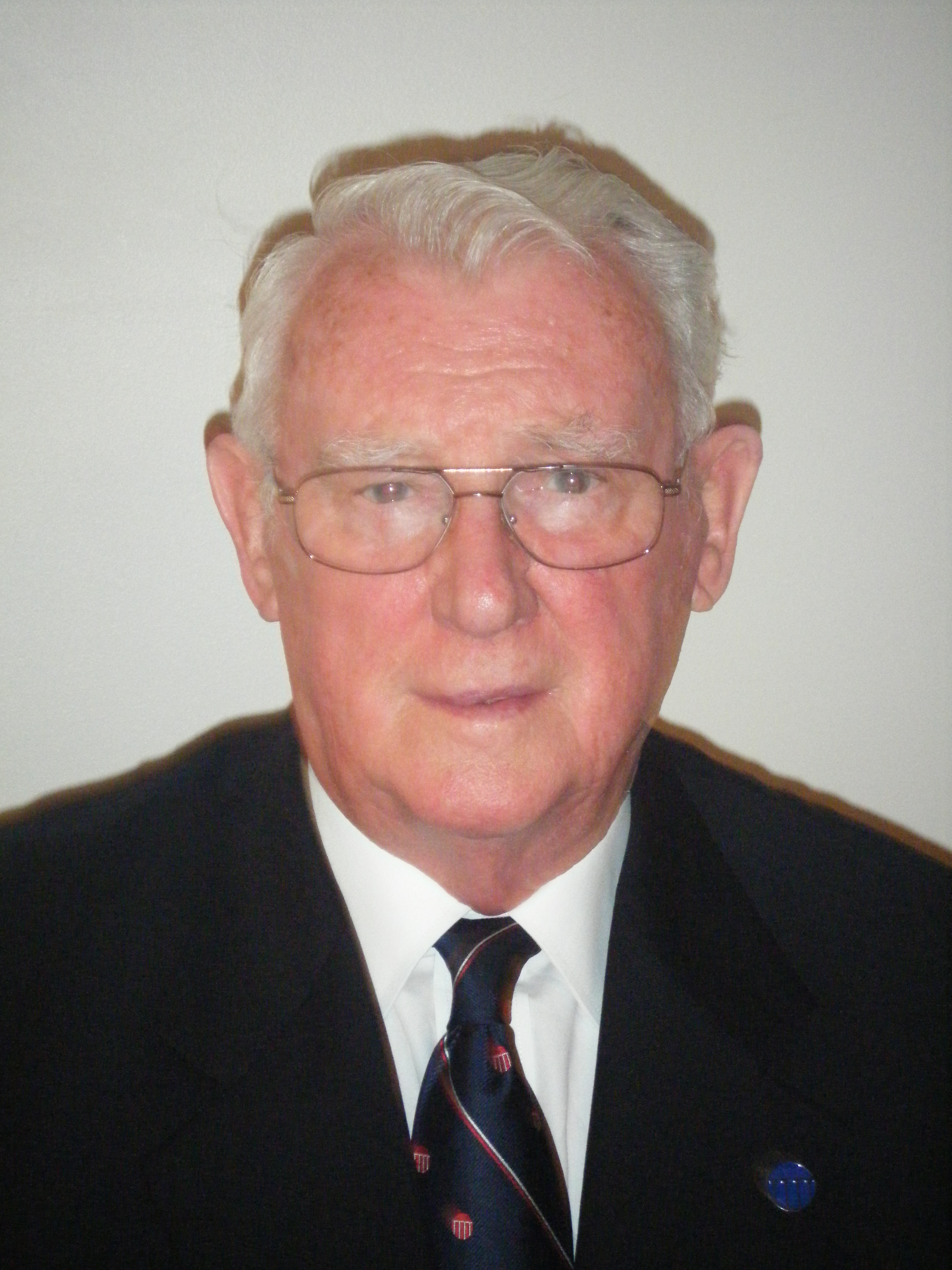
- Billinton in 2014

Academic background
- Education: University of Manitoba, University of Saskatchewan

Academic work
- Discipline: Power System Reliability
- Institutions: University of Saskatchewan
- Notable ideas: Composite System Modeling, Reliability Evaluation, Variable Resource Integration
- Awards: IEEE Charles Proteus Steinmetz Award (2008); IEEE Canada Electric Power Medal (2008); IEEE Canada Outstanding Engineering Educator Award (2001); CEA Distinguished Service Award (1991)

Roy Billinton (September 14, 1935 – December 23, 2025) was a Canadian scholar and a Distinguished Emeritus Professor at the University of Saskatchewan, Saskatoon, Saskatchewan, Canada. In 2008, Billinton won the IEEE Canada Electric Power Medal for his research and application of reliability concepts in electric power system. In 2007, Billinton was elected a Foreign Associate of the United States National Academy of Engineering for "contributions to teaching, research and application of reliability engineering in electric power generation, transmission, and distribution systems."

Billinton is known in academia and the power industry for his work on power system reliability evaluation. He is the author or co-author of eight books dealing with power system reliability. Two of these books, now in their second editions, have been republished in Chinese and one in Russian. His first book, published in 1970, is considered to be the first book in English on the subject of power system reliability. These books have been used worldwide as research and study textbooks. He is the author or co-author of over 950 technical papers related to his research with over 525 publications in international refereed journals. Over 400 papers were published in Conference Proceedings in Canada, the United States, the United Kingdom, France and other countries.

Billinton's other areas of significant contribution include the probabilistic evaluation of transient stability, overall system reliability incorporating a hierarchical system framework, common cause and dependent component outages, adverse weather outage models and the development of the Roy Billinton Test System (RBTS).

Billinton was a co-founder of the Probabilistic Methods Applied to Power Systems International Society in 1997 and has been on the board of the society as a director and chair since its inception.

Billinton died on December 23, 2025, at the age of 90.

== Academic career ==
Billinton obtained B.Sc. and M.Sc. degrees from the University of Manitoba, Ph.D. and D.Sc. degrees from the University of Saskatchewan, and received the University of Saskatchewan Distinguished Researcher Award in October 1993. He joined the University of Saskatchewan as an assistant professor in 1964, after working in the System Planning and Production Divisions of Manitoba Hydro. He became a fellow of the Royal Society of Canada in 1980, and was selected a fellow of the Canadian Academy of Engineering in 1999.

In addition, Billinton served the College of Engineering as executive director of the University of Saskatchewan 'Canadian International Development Authority (CIDA)'/Inner Mongolia Engineering College Project and as the University of Saskatchewan member on the CIDA/Nepal Engineering College Consortium. He served as chair of the Consortium for several years. His contributions to international activities at the University of Saskatchewan were recognized by presenting him with the J.W. George Ivany Internationalization Award in 2000.

Billinton supervised over one hundred and thirty graduate students. Over forty of these students obtained Ph.D degrees. His teaching skills have been recognized by receiving the IEEE Outstanding Power Engineer Educator Award in 1992 and the IEEE Canada Outstanding Engineer Educator Award in 2001. After holding a number of academic responsibilities at the University of Saskatchewan, including serving as an assistant professor, associate professor, professor, head of the Department of Electrical Engineering, assistant dean, associate dean, and acting dean. Billinton retired and became a professor emeritus effective July l, 2003.

== Research areas ==
Billinton's area of research is electric power system reliability, economics and performance. He co-founded the University of Saskatchewan Power System Research Group and developed a wide range of techniques to evaluate the reliability of engineering systems, from simple configurations to complex systems such as large electricity generation, electric power transmission and electric power distribution systems. His research has applied and studied the well-being approach in the system operating domain, in generating capacity planning and in composite system reliability evaluation. These studies include the effects of variable wind power and are considered to be significant contributions to power system reliability research. Billinton has made a significant contribution to the development and application of quantitative techniques for past performance and predictive assessment of power system reliability.

=== Utilization of Markov models ===
Billinton's work involves both repair and replacement activities. An important initial contribution by Billinton to the power engineering literature was the utilization of Markov models to incorporate component repair and spare component provisions. These models were applied to evaluate the benefits of spare transformers and mercury arc valves in high voltage direct current transmission converter stations, such as those being considered by Manitoba Hydro for their Nelson River development. This was an important practical application of Markov modeling. Markov models are now routinely used in many power system reliability applications.

=== Incorporation of variable resources ===
One important area of research that arose from earlier studies at Manitoba Hydro was the recognition and need to quantitatively evaluate the operating risk associated with adding large generating units to a relatively small electric power utility. This concern resulted in a major area of study on spinning or operating capacity reliability assessment that incorporated load forecast uncertainty, rapid start and hot reserve considerations, and the incorporation of interruptible loads. These studies were completed many years ago but are now being reconsidered and extended to incorporate renewable energy sources. The increasing penetration of wind power in modern electric power systems introduces new dimensions in risk evaluation in both the planning and operating domains. Considerable progress has been made in incorporating the inherent variability associated with wind power in both generating capacity adequacy and security evaluation.

=== Cost of customer interruptions ===
One of the most visible areas of Billinton's research is that of reliability cost/worth evaluation involving customer power interruption costs. This research extends the calculation of conventional reliability indices to include customer damage in the form of increased monetary costs due to power supply failures. This is now known as value-based reliability assessment (VBRA), in which the unreliability costs are added to the capital and operating costs to produce the total cost value used in project decision making. The VBRA process involves having component reliability data, the ability to calculate suitable load point reliability indices and applicable customer damage costs. These three requirements are highly visible contributions in Billinton's list of journal and conference publications.

== Impact on industry ==
Billinton's research work and related industrial activities have provided considerable assistance in the development of models, methods and standards for component and system reliability assessment. His contributions to the IEEE Standard developments, the CEA Equipment Reliability Information System (ERIS) and Electric Power System Performance Assessment (EPSRA) systems and the research and development of reliability models were recognized by the IEEE by presenting Billinton with the Charles Proteus Steinmetz Award in 2008. Billinton has provided consulting services to all the major Canadian electric power utilities and many other organizations around the world. He has presented over 100 individual utility courses dealing with power system reliability evaluation.

=== IEEE involvement ===
Billinton has been very active in the Institute of Electrical and Electronics Engineers (IEEE). He joined the IEEE Application of Probability Methods (APM) Subcommittee in 1964 and subsequently served a three-year term as its chairman. He has served on many Task Forces (TF) and Working Groups (WG) over the past fifty years. These include the Performance Records for Optimizing System Design (PROSD) WG, the T & D Component Outage Data TF, the Deterministic Transmission Criteria TF, the Bulk Power Indices TF (chair) and numerous others. He has been involved in the development and subsequent creation of three important standards in the area of power system reliability assessment. He became a fellow of the IEEE in 1978.

The Roy Billinton Power System Reliability Award was initiated in 2010 by the IEEE Power & Energy Society to honor Billinton and "to recognize outstanding individuals for their contributions to reliability of electric power systems."

=== Canadian Electricity Association ===
Billinton had considerable connection over a long period of time with the Canadian Electricity Association (CEA). He joined the CEA in 1962 while working for Manitoba Hydro. He served as CEA's Chair of the Power System Reliability Subsection, the System Planning and Operating Section and the Engineering and Operating Division. He is a founding member of the CEA Consultative Committee on Outage Statistics and served as its chair for over twenty-five years. Under his guidance, the CEA has developed and operates, what is considered the most comprehensive power system outage data collection system in the world.

The Equipment Reliability Information System (ERIS) collects and produces component outage data for generation and transmission systems. The Electric Power System Performance Assessment (EPSRA) protocols cover bulk system performance assessment, significant power interruptions and service continuity data. The ERIS and EPSRA methodologies developed for collecting data using a common set of definitions are now accepted as Canadian electric power industry standards. Both ERIS and EPSRA are national systems that have the strong support of Canada's electric power utilities. The models and techniques developed in Billinton's research program have provided considerable impetus to the development of suitable protocols for component and system outage data collection.

His contributions to the CEA and Canada were recognized by giving him the CEA Centennial Award for distinguished service to the Canadian electric power industry in 1991.

== Honors ==
- Foreign Associate, United States National Academy of Engineering, 2007
- Fellow, Canadian Academy of Engineering, 1999
- Fellow, Safety and Reliability Society (U.K.), 1988–2002
- Fellow, Engineering Institute of Canada, 1981
- Fellow, Royal Society of Canada, 1980
- Fellow, Institute of Electrical and Electronics Engineers, 1978
- Institute of Electrical and Electronics Engineers Initiated the Roy Billinton Power Reliability Award, 2010

== Awards ==
- IEEE Power & Energy Society, Prize Paper Award, 2014
- IEEE Canada Electric Power Medal, 2008
- IEEE Charles Proteus Steinmetz Award, 2008
- Saskatchewan Centennial Medal, 2005
- IEEE Third Millennium Medal, 2002
- IEEE Canada Outstanding Engineering Educator Award, 2001
- J.W. George Ivany Internationalization Award, October 2000
- IEEE McNaughton Gold Medal, September 1994.
- University of Saskatchewan Distinguished Researcher Award, October 1993
- IEEE Outstanding Power Engineering Educator Award July 1992
- First Recipient of the Canadian Electrical Association Distinguished Service Award - non utility category, Centennial Meeting, Toronto, May 1991
- Association of Professional Engineers of Saskatchewan Engineering Achievement Award, 1986
- Saskatoon Engineer of the Year, 1978
- Engineering Institute of Canada, Ross Medal, 1972
- Engineering Institute of Canada, Sir George Nelson Award, 1965, 1967
- University of Manitoba Gold Medal, 1960

== Published works ==
=== Academic books (authored or coauthored) ===
- R. Billinton; R.N. Allan (1996). Reliability Evaluation of Power Systems (2nd ed.). Plenum Press. ISBN 978-0-306-45259-8.
- ——; W. Li (1994). Reliability Assessment of Electric Power Systems Using Monte Carlo Methods. Plenum Press. ISBN 978-0-306-44781-5.
- ——; R.N. Allan (1992). Reliability Evaluation of Engineering Systems (2nd ed.). Plenum Press. ISBN 978-0-306-44063-2.
- ——; R.N. Allan; L. Salvaderi (1991). Applied Reliability Assessment in Electric Power Systems. IEEE Press. ISBN 978-0-87942-264-6.
- ——; R.N. Allan (1988). Reliability Assessment of Large Electric Power Systems. Kluwer Academic Publisher. ISBN 978-0-89838-266-2.
- ——; C. Singh (1977). System Reliability Modelling and Evaluation. Hutchinsons Educational Press. ISBN 978-0-09-126500-7.
- ——; R.J. Ringlee; A.J. Wood (1973). Power System Reliability Calculations. MIT Press. ISBN 978-0-262-02098-5.
- —— (1970). Power System Reliability Evaluation. Gordon and Breach Science Publishers. ISBN 978-0-677-02870-5.

=== Selected academic articles ===
- Wangdee, W.; Billinton, R. (2012). "Probing the Intermittent Energy Resource Contributions from Generation Adequacy and Security Perspectives". IEEE Transactions on Power Systems. 27 (4): 2306–2314. Bibcode:2012ITPSy..27.2306W. doi:10.1109/TPWRS.2012.2204281. S2CID 21072110.
- Billinton, R.; Gao, Y.; Karki, R. (2009). "Composite System Adequacy Assessment Incorporating Large-Scale Wind Energy Conversion Systems Considering Wind Speed Correlation". IEEE Transactions on Power Systems. 24 (3): 1375–1382. Bibcode:2009ITPSy..24.1375B. doi:10.1109/TPWRS.2009.2023263. S2CID 22761343.
- Billinton, R.; Karki, B.; Karki, R.; Ramakrishna, G. (2009). "Unit Commitment Risk Analysis of Wind Integrated Power Systems". IEEE Transactions on Power Systems. 24 (2): 930–939. Bibcode:2009ITPSy..24..930B. doi:10.1109/TPWRS.2009.2016485.
- Billinton, R.; Gao, Y. (2008). "Multi-state Wind Energy Conversion System Models for Adequacy Assessment of Generating Systems Incorporating Wind Energy". IEEE Transactions on Energy Conversion. 23 (2): 163–170. Bibcode:2008ITEnC..23..163B. doi:10.1109/TEC.2006.882415. S2CID 22640862.
- Billinton, R.; Wangdee, W. (2007). "Reliability-Based Transmission Reinforcement Planning Associated With Large-Scale Wind Farms". IEEE Transactions on Power Systems. 22 (1): 34–41. Bibcode:2007ITPSy..22...34B. doi:10.1109/TPWRS.2006.889126. S2CID 13277730.
- Billinton, R.; Bai, G. (2004). "Generating Capacity Adequacy Associated With Wind Energy". IEEE Transactions on Energy Conversion. 19 (3): 641–646. Bibcode:2004ITEnC..19..641B. doi:10.1109/TEC.2004.827718. S2CID 21204020.
- Karki, R.; Billinton, R. (2001). "Reliability/Cost Implications of PV and Wind Energy Utilization in Small Isolated Power Systems". IEEE Transactions on Energy Conversion. 16 (4): 368–373. Bibcode:2001ITEnC..16..368K. doi:10.1109/60.969477.
- Billinton, R.; Karki, R. (1999). "Capacity Reserve Assessment Using System Well-Being Analysis". IEEE Transactions on Power Systems. 14 (2): 433–438. Bibcode:1999ITPSy..14..433B. doi:10.1109/59.761861.
- Billinton, R.; Chen, H.; Ghajar, R. (1996). "Time Series Models for Reliability Evaluation of Power Systems Including Wind Energy". Journal of Microelectronics and Reliability. 36 (9): 1253–1261. doi:10.1016/0026-2714(95)00154-9.
- Billinton, R.; Li, W. (1993). "A System State Transition Sampling Method for Composite System Reliability Evaluation". IEEE Transactions on Power Systems. 8 (3): 761–770. Bibcode:1993ITPSy...8..761B. doi:10.1109/59.260930.
- Allan, R.; Billinton, R.; Sjarief, I.; Goel, L.; So, K. (1991). "A Reliability Test System for Educational Purposes - Basic Distribution System Data and Results". IEEE Transactions on Power Systems. 6 (2): 813–820. Bibcode:1991ITPSy...6..813A. doi:10.1109/59.76730.
- Billinton, R.; Kumar, S.; Chowdhury, N.; Chu; Goel, L.; Khan, E.; Kos, P.; Nourbakhsh, G.; Oteng-Adjei, J.; et al. (1990). "A Reliability Test System for Educational Purposes - Basic Results" (PDF). IEEE Transactions on Power Systems. 5 (1): 319–325. Bibcode:1990ITPSy...5..319B. doi:10.1109/59.49123.
- Billinton, R.; Kumar, S.; Chowdhury, N.; Chu; Debnath, K.; Goel, L.; Khan, E.; Kos, P.; Nourbakhsh, G.; Oteng-Adjei, J.; et al. (1989). "A Reliability Test System for Educational Purposes - Basic Data" (PDF). IEEE Power Engineering Review. 4 (3): 1238–1244. Bibcode:1989ITPSy...4.1238B. doi:10.1109/MPER.1989.4310918. S2CID 25154559.
- Billinton, R.; Vohra, P. (1987). "Station-Initiated Outages In Composite System Adequacy Evaluation". IEE Proceedings C - Generation, Transmission and Distribution. 134 (1): 10–16. doi:10.1049/ip-c.1987.0002.
- Allan, R.; Billinton, R.; Abdel-Gawad, N. (1986). "The IEEE Reliability Test System - Extensions To And Evaluation Of The Generating System". IEEE Transactions on Power Systems. 1 (4): 1–7. Bibcode:1986ITPSy...1d...1A. doi:10.1109/TPWRS.1986.4335006. S2CID 52859163.
- Billinton, R.; Kuruganty, P. (1980). "A Probabilistic Index For Transient Stability". IEEE Transactions on Power Apparatus and Systems. 99 (1): 195–207. Bibcode:1980ITPAS..99..195B. doi:10.1109/TPAS.1980.319629. S2CID 43545037.
- Billinton, R.; Medicherla, T.; Sachdev, M. (1978). "Common Cause Outages In Multiple Circuit Transmission Lines". IEEE Transactions on Reliability. R-27 (2): 128–131. doi:10.1109/TR.1978.5220281. S2CID 21369748.
- Billinton, R.; Jain, A. (1972). "The Effect Of Rapid Start And Hot Reserve Units In Spinning Reserve Studies". IEEE Transactions on Power Apparatus and Systems. 91 (2): 511–516. Bibcode:1972ITPAS..91..511B. doi:10.1109/TPAS.1972.293234.
- Billinton, R. (1969). "Composite System Reliability Evaluation". IEEE Transactions on Power Apparatus and Systems. 88 (4): 276–281. Bibcode:1969ITPAS..88..276B. doi:10.1109/TPAS.1969.292425.
- Billinton, R.; Bollinger, K. (1968). "Transmission System Reliability Evaluation Using Markov Processes". IEEE Transactions on Power Apparatus and Systems. 87 (2): 538–547. Bibcode:1968ITPAS..87..538B. doi:10.1109/TPAS.1968.292051.
