= Luis Marti =

Electrical engineer

Luis Marti is an electrical engineer at Hydro One Networks Inc. in Toronto, Ontario, until March 2017. He was named a Fellow of the Institute of Electrical and Electronics Engineers (IEEE) in 2015 for his contributions to modeling and simulation of electromagnetic transients.
