= Shifo, Hebei =

Shifo 石佛镇
- Town
- Shifozhen
- Location in Hebei Shifo (China)
- Coordinates: 38°24′N 115°18′E
- Country: People's Republic of China
- Province: Hebei
- Prefecture-level city: Baoding
- County-level city: Anguo

Area
  - Total: 54.71 km^{2} (21.12 sq mi)

Population (2010)
  - Total: 32,266
  - Density: 589.8/km^{2} (1,527/sq mi)
- Time zone: UTC+8 (China Standard)
- Local dialing code: 312

Shifo (Chinese: 石佛镇; pinyin: Shífó zhèn) is a town in Anguo, Baoding, Hebei, China. In 2010, Shifo had a total population of 32,266: 16,418 males and 15,848 females: 5,261 aged under 14, 24,032 aged between 15 and 65, and 2,973 aged over 65.

== See also ==
- List of township-level divisions of Hebei
