= Edward Dobrowolski =

American electrical engineer

Edward Dobrowolski is an electrical engineer with the North American Electric Reliability Corporation in Atlanta, Georgia. He was named a Fellow of the Institute of Electrical and Electronics Engineers (IEEE) in 2015 for his work in developing interactive control center technology.
