= Shengwei Mei =

Chinese electrical engineer

Shengwei Mei is a professor of electrical engineering at the Department of Electrical Engineering at Tsinghua University in Beijing, China. He was named a Fellow of the Institute of Electrical and Electronics Engineers (IEEE) in 2015 for his work on the robust control and complexity analysis of power systems.
