= Chandan Chakraborty =

Indian electrical engineer

Chandan Chakraborty is a professor of electrical engineering at the Indian Institute of Technology Kharagpur, India. He was named Fellow of the Institute of Electrical and Electronics Engineers (IEEE) in 2015 for contributions to estimation techniques and control of induction machine and drive systems.
