= QI (Czech game show) =

- Title card
- Genre: Comedy
- Presented by: Leoš Mareš
- Starring: Patrik Hezucký; Guest panellists
- Theme music composer: Howard Goodall
- Country of origin: Czech Republic
- No. of series: 1
- No. of episodes: 12

Production
- Running time: 30 minutes 45 minutes (XL)
- Production company: Good TV Production

Original release
- Network: TV Prima
- Release: 14 August – 23 October 2013

Related
- QI (UK); QI (Dutch); Intresseklubben (Swedish)

QI (Quite Interesting) is a Czech panel show aired by TV Prima. The format is based on the UK version of QI. The program is hosted by Leoš Mareš alongside regular guest Patrik Hezucký. On the show, Leoš Mareš asks interesting, often obscure questions, the guests can score points for answers that are funny and interesting.

== Episodes ==
As in the British version of QI, the series are themed around one letter of the alphabet.

=== Series A (2013) ===
Twelve episodes, all beginning with the letter "A", were broadcast on TV Prima.

Episode number	Title (English translation)	Panelists	Winner	Air date	Ratings (thousands)
1	Auto (Car)	Adela Banášová; Miloš Knor; Prof. Cyril Höschl	Prof. Cyril Höschl	14 August 2013; 17 August 2013 (XL)	384
2	Apokalypsa (Apocalypse)	Adela Banášová; Matěj Ruppert; Zbigniew Czendlik	Adela Banášová	21 August 2013; 24 August 2013 (XL)	395
3	Absurdita (Absurdity)	Dr. Ivo Šmoldas; Petr Vydra; Miloš Knor	Dr. Ivo Šmoldas	28 August 2013; 31 August 2013 (XL)	303
4	Astronomie (Astronomy)	Diana Kobzanová; Jakub Kohák; Dr. Ivo Šmoldas	Dr. Ivo Šmoldas	4 September 2013; 7 September 2013 (XL)	320
5	Afrodisiaka (Aphrodisiacs)	Sandra Pogodová; Jakub Kohák; Miloš Knor	Jakub Kohák	11 September 2013; 14 September 2013 (XL)	324
6	Aero (Aero)	Adela Banášová; Miloš Knor; Dr. Ivo Šmoldas	Miloš Knor	18 September 2013; 21 September 2013 (XL)	305
7	Afrika (Africa)	Bohumil Klepl; Iva Pazderková; Dr. Ivo Šmoldas	Iva Pazderková	25 September 2013; 28 September 2013 (XL)	380
8	Atletika (Athletics)	Adela Banášová; Ondřej Hejma; Jakub Kohák	Adela Banášová	2 October 2013; 5 October 2013 (XL)	334
9	Amerika (America)	Dominik Heřman Lev; Petr Vydra; Aleš Háma	Dominik Heřman Lev	9 October 2013; 12 October 2013 (XL)	353
10	Alkohol (Alcohol)	Edita Urbaníková; Zbigniew Czendlik; Ondřej Hejma	Ondřej Hejma	16 October 2013; 19 October 2013 (XL)	298
11	Adam (Adam)	Edita Urbaníková; Miloš Knor; Marcel Šůcha	Miloš Knor	23 October 2013; 26 October 2013 (XL)	298
-	Apetit (speciál) (Apetit special)	Alice Bendová; Bohumil Klepl; Jakub Kohák	Alice Bendová a Patrik Hezucký	5 October 2013	214
