= Solveig Ward =

Electrical engineer

Solveig Ward (1954) is an electrical engineer from Quanta Technology in Raleigh, North Carolina.

Ward is originally from Stockholm, Sweden, where she was born on August 22, 1954; she grew up nearby, in Vällingby. As a student at the KTH Royal Institute of Technology, she was interested in nuclear engineering, but instead studied electrical engineering; after the first semester of studies, she was the only woman in her class. After finishing her master's degree in 1978, she began her career as an engineer in training at ASEA.

== Awards and honors ==
Ward received the PSRC Distinguished Service Award of the IEEE Power System Relaying and Control Committee in 2013. She was named a Fellow of the Institute of Electrical and Electronics Engineers (IEEE) in 2014, "for her contributions to power system protective relaying, communications systems, and teleprotection". She was the recipient of the 2020 IEEE Charles Proteus Steinmetz Award "for leadership in and contributions to protection and communication standards for improved power system reliability".
