= Ming Cheng =

Ming Cheng is a Professor of Electrical Engineering at Southeast University, Nanjing, China was named Fellow of the Institute of Electrical and Electronics Engineers (IEEE) in 2015 for contributions to the development and control of stator permanent magnet machines for vehicular propulsion and wind power generation.
