= Li Qi (engineer) =

Chinese electrical engineer

Li "Lisa" Qi (Chinese: 亓丽) is a Chinese electrical engineer whose research has focused on direct current power distribution on ships. She is a professor of electrical engineering at Xi'an Jiaotong University.

== Education and career ==
Qi is originally from Xi'an. She has a 1994 bachelor's degree in power systems and automation from Xi'an Jiaotong University. She received a master's degree in 1997 from Zhejiang University, and completed her Ph.D. in 2004 at Texas A&M University in the US. Her dissertation, AC system stability analysis and assessment for shipboard power systems, was supervised by Karen Butler-Purry.

After postdoctoral research at Florida State University from 2004 to 2009, Qi joined ABB in its US Research and Development Center in Raleigh, North Carolina, where she worked from 2009 to 2024, before returning to Xi'an Jiaotong University as a professor.

== Recognition ==
Qi was elected as an IEEE Fellow in 2024, "for contributions to DC distribution protection and architectures of DC shipboard power systems".
