= David Lubkeman =

American electrical engineer

David Lubkeman from North Carolina State University, Raleigh, North Carolina was named Fellow of the Institute of Electrical and Electronics Engineers (IEEE) in 2015 for contributions to power system distribution systems. He holds Ph.D. in Electrical Engineering from Purdue University.
