= Rabl (company) =

Israeli chocolate manufacturer

Rabl Chocolate & Sweets Factory Ltd. was one of Israel's largest chocolate and sweet manufacturers during the twentieth century. Rabl was founded by Willy Hans Rabl, a Czechoslovak refugee, in Tel Aviv, Israel. It was a listed company on the Israel Directory. Rabl exported hard boiled sweets across the Middle East.
