= G. Bhuvaneswari =

Indian electrical engineer

Gurumoorthy Bhuvaneswari (born 1965) is an Indian electrical engineer whose research involves power electronics, electric power conversion, and electric machines. She is a professor at Mahindra University.

== Education and career ==
Bhuvaneswari is originally from South India, the youngest of five children in a poor family, and earned an engineering degree in 1985 from the College of Engineering (Guindy Campus) of Anna University. She went to IIT Madras for graduate study, earning a master's degree in 1988 and completing a Ph.D. in 1992.

She worked as a lecturer at Anna University, and then from 1993 to 1997 in the US at Commonwealth Edison in Chicago, before returning to India and academia as a faculty member in IIT Delhi from 1997 until 2021. In 2021, she moved to her present position at Mahindra University.

== Recognition ==
Bhuvaneswari is a member of the Indian National Academy of Engineering. She was named an IEEE Fellow, in the 2017 class of fellows, "for contributions to design and development of enhanced power quality converters". She is one of two 2018 recipients of the IEEE Power Engineering Society Wanda Reder Pioneer in Power Award.

She was elected as an International Member to the US National Academy of Engineering in 2022, "for contributions to advancement of power converters to improve power quality, and leadership in using advanced technologies for education". The following year, she became a laureate of the Asian Scientist 100 by the Asian Scientist.
