= João Catalão =

Professor of electrical and computer engineering

João P. S. Catalão
- Education: University of Porto
- Awards: IEEE fellow
- Scientific career
- Fields: Power systems, renewable energy sources

João P. S. Catalão is a Portuguese electrical engineer and academic. He is currently a professor in the Faculty of Engineering at the University of Porto. He is an IEEE fellow.

== Education and career ==
Catalão received his bachelor's, master's, and Ph.D. degrees in electrical and computer engineering from the University of Porto in 1995, 1998, and 2004, respectively. He then worked as a postdoctoral researcher at Carnegie Mellon University before joining the faculty at the University of Porto.

Catalão's research primarily focuses on power systems, with an emphasis on the integration of renewable energy sources, energy storage systems, and demand response. He has authored and co-authored numerous articles in prestigious international journals and conferences.

== Professional Contributions ==
Catalão is a senior member of the Institute of Electrical and Electronics Engineers (IEEE), where he serves as the chair of the Power Systems Operation, Planning, and Economics Subcommittee of the Power and Energy Society. He is also a member of the European Network of Transmission System Operators for Electricity (ENTSO-E) Regional Group South.

== Awards and recognition ==
Catalão has received numerous awards and recognition for his research and professional contributions. In 2012, he was awarded the IEEE PES Outstanding Young Engineer Award for his contributions to the integration of distributed generation and electric vehicles into power systems. He also received the Prize for Best Paper published in the IEEE Transactions on Smart Grid in 2015.

== Selected publications ==
- Talari, Saber; Shafie-khah, Miadreza; Siano, Pierluigi; Loia, Vincenzo; Tommasetti, Aurelio; Catalão, João P. S. (April 2017). "A Review of Smart Cities Based on the Internet of Things Concept". Energies. 10 (4): 421. doi:10.3390/en10040421. ISSN 1996-1073.
- Paterakis, Nikolaos G.; Erdinç, Ozan; Catalão, João P. S. (1 March 2017). "An overview of Demand Response: Key-elements and international experience" (PDF). Renewable and Sustainable Energy Reviews. 69: 871–891. doi:10.1016/j.rser.2016.11.167. ISSN 1364-0321. S2CID 114412356.
- Catalão, J. P. S.; Mariano, S. J. P. S.; Mendes, V. M. F.; Ferreira, L. A. F. M. (1 August 2007). "Short-term electricity prices forecasting in a competitive market: A neural network approach". Electric Power Systems Research. 77 (10): 1297–1304. doi:10.1016/j.epsr.2006.09.022. hdl:10400.6/645. ISSN 0378-7796.
- Erdinc, Ozan; Paterakis, Nikolaos G.; Mendes, Tiago D. P.; Bakirtzis, Anastasios G.; P. S. Catalão, João (May 2015). "Smart Household Operation Considering Bi-Directional EV and ESS Utilization by Real-Time Pricing-Based DR". IEEE Transactions on Smart Grid. 6 (3): 1281–1291. doi:10.1109/TSG.2014.2352650. ISSN 1949-3061. S2CID 206780191.
- Paterakis, Nikolaos G.; Erdinç, Ozan; Bakirtzis, Anastasios G.; Catalão, João P. S. (December 2015). "Optimal Household Appliances Scheduling Under Day-Ahead Pricing and Load-Shaping Demand Response Strategies" (PDF). IEEE Transactions on Industrial Informatics. 11 (6): 1509–1519. doi:10.1109/TII.2015.2438534. ISSN 1941-0050. S2CID 15220474.
