= Philip Overholt =

American electrical engineer

Philip Overholt is an electrical engineer at the United States Department of Energy in Washington, D.C. He was named a Fellow of the Institute of Electrical and Electronics Engineers (IEEE) in 2015 for his work in the development and deployment of synchrophasor technology.
