= Maria Tavares (artist) =

Portuguese artist, art teacher (born 1965)

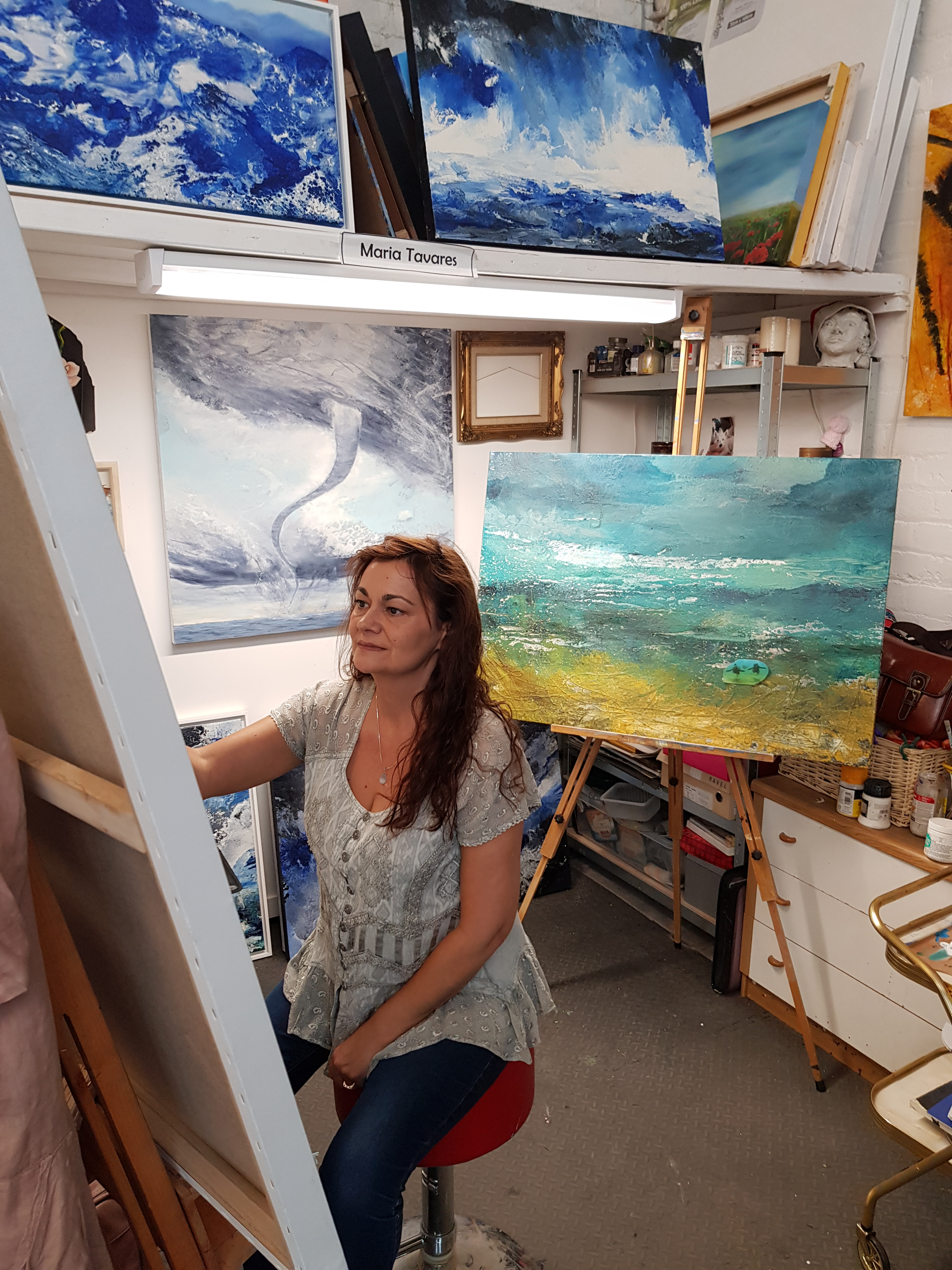
Maria 'Miza' Tavares, at work in her artist's studio, in Liverpool, 2018.

Maria "Miza" Tavares (née Maria do Rosario Castanheira de Carvalho) is a Portuguese artist and art teacher, born in Santiago do Cacem on 15 May 1965.

Tavares specialises in acrylics, and takes her inspiration from landscapes and seascapes, focusing more recently on the effects that climate change has on the natural world around us in her collection Elements. Her art merges abstract and semi abstract.

== Early life and education ==
Tavares was born in Santiago do Cacem and moved to Lisbon when she was three years old. Tavares was born to Manuel de Carvalho and Piedade de Carvalho and is the second among their three daughters. As the children of a Catholic mother who followed Portuguese tradition, all three siblings were given the name Maria, followed by another unique given name. Tavares's other given name is Rosario, which is the name that she was referred to by friends and family growing up. It was through playing with her sisters at an early age that she adopted the nickname, Miza, the name by which she signs her art, today.

=== Education ===
Tavares attended secondary school at Escola Secundaria de Santo Andre in the city of Barreiro, graduating in 1982 with a range of NVQs, mainly in the field of education. In 1994, Tavares moved to Brazil, where she began taking art classes in various artist's studios in São Paulo. She stayed in the country for seven years. Tavares also lived in Lausanne and Madrid before finally settling in Liverpool at the turn of the century. She qualified as a teacher at the University of Central Lancashire in 2006.

== Personal life ==
Tavares divorced in 2011, and for the sake of her art decided to keep her married name, as she had painted under this name for 25 years. In 2010, Tavares was diagnosed with Multiple Sclerosis (MS), following years of unexplained health problems, which went undiagnosed by doctors, one of which suggested she should try anti-depressants.

Tavares's collection of art, Vitamin D, was designed to raise awareness for MS and its links to Vitamin D deficiency, and was exhibited at The Gallery, in Liverpool in 2012.

Tavares has two daughters and two grandchildren, and currently lives in Liverpool, UK.

== Art ==
Tavares started painting using oil paints, and although she has used watercolour and pastels, she mainly uses them for sketches and studies. Today, Tavares's art combines a combination of acrylics, texture, pastels and oils

Alongside her art, Tavares teaches her craft to a range of ages and abilities, initially teaching art at Hugh Baird College in Bootle before moving on to teach for the Workers' Educational Association.

As well as teaching in colleges, Tavares works with Tate Liverpool each year to deliver a course entitled: Painting Inspired by Women Artists. The course looks at how female artists have been marginalised and misrepresented throughout history.

Based in the Baltic Triangle, the creative and digital heartland of Liverpool, Tavares shares a studio with Hub Artists, a local independent collective of artists and sculptors. In 2019 she focused on her collection, Elements, which aspires to capture the essence of a turbulent climate and aims to depict the beauty and horror of environmental catastrophes.

Tavares is currently conducting research at Queen's University Belfast on the processes of construction and representations of female heroism in Mozambique, financed by the Leverhulme Trust.

- 1996 – Nossa Caixa Bank – Sao Jose dos Campos – Brazil
- 1997 – Condominio Maitinga – Sao Jose dos Campos – Brazil
- 1998 – Sociedade Brasileira de Artists Plasticos – São Paulo – Brazil
- 2002 – Tate Liverpool – Group exhibition
- 2006 – Liverpool Cathedral
- 2009 – FACT – Liverpool – Interactive art exhibition
- 2010 – The Liverpool Academy of Arts
- 2013 – Liverpool Gallery – 'Vitamin D - Let the Sun Shine'
- 2014 – 'Abstraction' – The Liverpool Academy of Arts
- 2015 – PARTIA - Aintree University Hospital
- 2017 – Art Basel – Basel, Switzerland
- 2017 – Fisher's Theatre – Suffolk
- 2017 – Northern Lights, Cain's Brewery – Liverpool
- 2018 – Williamson Art Gallery and Museum – Birkenhead

== Interviews ==
Hub Studios: a new exhibition at Castle Park Arts Centre
