= Li Qi (politician, born 1914) =

Chinese politician

Li Qi (October 30, 1914 – July 10, 1966, Chinese: 李琪), previously referred to as Shen Naiting (Chinese: 沈乃庭), was a politician from Linyi County, Shanxi, China, and an official of the Chinese Communist Party (CCP).

== Biography ==
During his youth, Li Qi's family faced financial hardship, resulting in his attendance at private school for only five years. Subsequently, through self-directed learning, he amassed a considerable body of knowledge in culture, history, and political theory. Throughout the Second Sino-Japanese War and the Second Chinese Civil War, he operated extensively behind enemy lines in the eighth sub-district of the Jinsui Border Region (Chinese: 晋绥边区). He was repeatedly followed by the enemy but evaded capture with the assistance of the populace.

In January 1949, Li Qi attended the Academy of Marx and Lenin, the predecessor of the Central Party School. Upon concluding his studies, he was retained by the academy as an educator, specializing in the history of the CCP, and subsequently taught philosophy at the Department of Philosophy at Peking University. He authored “The Proper Understanding of the Study of Marxism and Leninism” and “Talking about the Study of the Theory of Historical Materialism,” and published two works, “The Explanation of the Theory of Practice” and “Explanation of the Theory of Contradictions,” in 1953 and 1956, respectively. In early 1961, Li Qi was appointed to the CCP Beijing Municipal Committee as a member of the Standing Committee and Minister of Propaganda.

In 1963, Jiang Qing arrived in Beijing to undertake research for the "Theater Revolution". This compelled Li Qi to concentrate mostly on theater, particularly Peking Opera. In 1963, under Li Qi's direction, the Peking Opera Troupe adapted the Peking Opera "Underground Liaison" from the Shanghai Opera "Sparks in the Ludang," which faced criticism from Jiang Qing. From 1963 to 1965, Li Qi emphasized the importance of traditional, new historical, and modern operas, opposing the prohibition of traditional operas. In 1964, he said that old operas should preserve the distinctive traits of their respective genres. In October 1964, Jiang Qing suggested to the Beijing Municipal Committee of the CCP that the Northern Kunqu Opera Theater be amalgamated with the Beijing Opera Troupe to establish a Beijing-Kunquan ensemble, thus disbanding the Northern Kunqu Opera Theater, which Li Qi opposed. The disagreement between Li Qi and Jiang Qing intensified thereafter.

In late 1965, Yao Wenyuan authored a piece titled “Review of the New Historical Drama ‘Hai Rui Strikes Down His Office’” in Shanghai's Wen Wei Po, targeting Beijing's vice-mayor Wu Han. Subsequently, on May 16, 1966, the publication explicitly condemned Li Qi by name. Subsequently, Qi Benyu explicitly denounced Li Qi in Red Flag magazine. On July 10, 1966, Li Qi took his own life.
