= Yunnan Federation of Trade Unions =

Chinese trade union organization

The Yunnan Federation of Trade Unions (Chinese: 云南省总工会), or Yunnan Provincial Federation of Trade Unions is a provincial-level trade union organization governed by the Yunnan Provincial Committee of the Chinese Communist Party and the All-China Federation of Trade Unions, serving as the principal authority for trade union organizations throughout Yunnan Province.

== History ==
On May 1, 1927, the inaugural trade union groups in Yunnan were founded in Kunming and the tin mines of Gejiu. In early 1950, Yunnan was peacefully liberated, and in March of that year, the Yunnan Workers' Movement Committee of the Chinese Communist Party (CCP) was established. In January 1951, the Preparatory Committee for the Yunnan Provincial General Confederation of Trade Unions was officially established, followed by the convening of the First Congress of Trade Union Members of Yunnan in April 1953 in Kunming, which led to the election of the governing body of the Yunnan Federation of Trade Unions. The inaugural congress of trade union members in Yunnan Province convened in Kunming in April 1953, resulting in the election of the leadership for the Yunnan Federation of Trade Unions. Liu Linyuan was elected as the first president of Yunnan Federation of Trade Unions.
