= Poorvi Patel =

Swedish electrical engineer

Poorvi Patel is an electrical engineer from Sweden specializing in high-power transformers. She works in the US, for Hitachi Energy, after many years working for ABB and for the Electric Power Research Institute.

== Education and career ==
Patel grew up in Trollhättan, Sweden. She has a master's degree in mechanical engineering from the Luleå University of Technology, and completed a Ph.D. at Lund University.

She worked at ABB from 1999 until 2018, on transformer monitoring and diagnostics, initially in Västerås, Sweden. In 2006, as part of her work for ABB, she moved from Sweden to St. Louis, Missouri, to join the company's Transformer Remanufacturing and Engineering Solutions group. From 2018 to 2025 she worked for the Electric Power Research Institute, where her work focused on integrating green energy and data center loads into the power grid. She moved again to Hitachi Energy in 2025.

== Recognition ==
Patel was elected as an IEEE Fellow, in the 2026 class of fellows, "for leadership in monitoring, diagnostics and standards for power transformers".
