= Andrew Ott =

Electrical engineer

Andrew Ott is an electrical engineer at PJM Interconnection, L.L.C. in Norristown, Pennsylvania. He was named a Fellow of the Institute of Electrical and Electronics Engineers (IEEE) in 2014 for his work in the design, development, and operation of competitive wholesale electricity markets.
