= Debra Lew =

American power systems engineer

Debra J. Lew is an American engineering executive focusing on electrical power systems and on carbon-neutral sources of renewable energy such as wind power and solar power. She is the executive director of the Energy Systems Integration Group, a non-profit association focusing on educating engineers and the public about power systems.

== Education and career ==
Lew majored in electrical engineering and physics at the Massachusetts Institute of Technology, graduating in 1988. She has a Ph.D. in applied physics from Stanford University.

After working for the United States government National Renewable Energy Laboratory in Golden, Colorado, and then for General Electric as a senior technical director in its GE Energy Consulting firm, she joined the Energy Systems Integration Group (ESIG) in 2020 as its associate director. She was named executive director of ESIG in 2024, replacing its 1989 founder, Charlie Smith.

Lew also serves as a member of the Board on Energy and Environmental Systems of the National Academies of Sciences, Engineering, and Medicine.

== Recognition ==
Lew was named as an IEEE Fellow in the IEEE Fellows Class of 2025, "for contributions to grid integration of wind and solar power".
