= Surya Santoso =

Texas-based electrical engineer and professor

- Known for: Research in the fields of Power Quality, Root-Cause Analysis and Wind Power Systems Integration Authoring textbooks on Power Quality
- Scientific career
- Fields: Electrical Engineering

Surya Santoso is an associate professor of Electrical Engineering at the Cockrell School of Engineering at the University of Texas at Austin and directs the Laboratory for Advanced Studies in Electric Power & Integration of Renewable Energy Systems (L-ASPIRES). A senior member of Institute of Electrical and Electronics Engineers (IEEE), he is actively involved in the IEEE Power and Energy Society and has hosted the IEEE Plain Talk on Power Quality in IEEE Power and Energy General Meeting since 2010.

He is known for his pioneering work in root-cause analysis of electric power quality disturbances and for his work in time-domain modeling and simulation of electromagnetic transients and in wind power system integration studies.

== Biography ==
Dr. Santoso received his B.S. degree from Satya Wacana Christian University (1992) and his M.S. (1994) and Ph.D. (1996) degrees from the University of Texas at Austin, all in Electrical Engineering. After receiving his Ph.D. he became a postdoctoral fellow under the auspices of Electric Power Research Institute (EPRI).

=== Early career ===
From 1997 to 2003, Dr. Santoso was a senior power systems and consulting engineer with Electrotek Concepts. He was the lead developer for a number of intelligent systems algorithms used in power systems with applications in power quality and protection. These algorithms were commercialized as AnswerModule and are embedded in the advanced power quality monitoring platform, Dranetz's Encore (formerly known as Signature Systems). These algorithms are also deployed in PQView - a multi-component software system developed by Electrotek Concepts and EPRI for building and analyzing databases of power, power quality, and energy measurements. In addition, he carried out a wide variety of power systems studies in generation, transmission, and distribution systems. Examples of these studies include but not limited to wind power integration and interconnection studies, wind turbine and plant modeling, subsynchronous resonance, harmonics, capacitor energizing, ferroresonance, transient recovery voltage of circuit breakers, lightning protection, and series capacitor bank protection.

=== Academia ===
Dr. Santoso joined the faculty at the Cockrell School of Engineering at the University of Texas at Austin in 2003. He teaches courses in the broad area of electric power systems, particularly in power quality, modeling and simulation of electrical transients and wind power systems. Since becoming professor, he has graduated seven doctoral and twenty-four master's students.

== Textbooks, publications, patents ==
Dr. Santoso has published over 40 journal and 65 conference articles and holds 5 patents. He co-authored one of the leading books in power quality studies, Electric Power Systems Quality, now in its third edition and is the sole author of a college textbook on the same subject, Fundamentals of Electric Power Quality. In all, his publications have been cited over 5,700 times.

Since 2011 he has been an editor for ISRN Renewable Energy and since 2012 an editor for the Journal of Renewable Energy, both published by Hindawi Publishing.

== See also ==
- University of Texas at Austin
- Cockrell School of Engineering
- Renewable energy commercialisation
