= Li Qi (soldier) =

Chinese soldier (1960–1979)

- 李启
- Portrait of Li Qi
- Born: 1960; Fumin County, Yunnan, China
- Died: 23 February 1979 (aged 18–19); Near Cam Đường, Lào Cai Province, Vietnam
- Military career
- Allegiance: People's Republic of China
- Branch: People's Liberation Army Ground Force
- Service years: 1979
- Conflicts: Sino-Vietnamese War †
- Awards: First-class merit (posthumous); "Combat Hero" (posthumous)

Li Qi (Chinese: 李启; pinyin: Lǐ Qǐ; 1960 – 23 February 1979) was a Chinese soldier of Yi ethnicity who was killed in the Sino-Vietnamese War. He was posthumously awarded a first-class merit citation, and the Central Military Commission gave him the honorary title of "Combat Hero".

== Early life ==
Li was born in 1960 in Fumin County, Yunnan. According to a 1982 account published by the Yunnan Provincial Department of Civil Affairs, he asked to enlist in late 1978, as tensions rose on the China–Vietnam border. His village party secretary was at first reluctant to let him go because his family was large and short of labour, but agreed after Li repeatedly insisted.

== Military service ==
Li joined the People's Liberation Army in January 1979 and was assigned as a new soldier to the 3rd Squad of the 4th Company of a unit of the Yunnan border defence forces. The 1982 account states that he continued training despite an infected leg wound and a high fever before the fighting began.

The Sino-Vietnamese War began on 17 February 1979. According to the 1982 account, on 18 February, while his company was searching high ground, Li joined an attack by a neighbouring company and fired ten rounds before returning to his own unit.

On 23 February 1979, the 4th Company was ordered to take Hill 369 and two neighbouring hills on the outskirts of Cam Đường, beside the road from Lào Cai to Cam Đường. According to the Chinese account, the position was held by the command post of the 3rd Battalion of the Vietnamese 118th Regiment and a reinforced company. During the attack, Li advanced with an assault platoon against the right flank of the position. Vietnamese forces fired incendiary rounds that set the grass and brush alight, while heavy fire from the front and right pinned down the platoon.

By then, Li had been seriously wounded, with his left thigh broken by gunfire. According to the official accounts, after about eight hours of fighting and 27 hours without food or water, he refused to be carried away by his squad leader, Zhang Shihe, and crawled towards the Vietnamese positions through the burning grass, firing as he went, to draw fire away from his platoon as it moved to attack from the left. He crawled more than 120 metres through the fire, and Chinese accounts credit him with killing four Vietnamese soldiers. The platoon then took the hill from the left. Li was killed in the attack. His comrades later found his body, burnt beyond recognition, still holding his rifle. He was buried at the Martyrs' Cemetery in Mengzi, Yunnan.

== Honours ==
After his death, the party committee of his unit posthumously admitted Li to the Chinese Communist Party and awarded him a first-class merit citation. The Central Military Commission conferred on him the honorary title of "Combat Hero".
