= Li Qi (ethicist) =

Li Qi (1913 – November 17, 2009, Chinese: 李奇), previously known as Li Zijrang (Chinese: 李子让), hailed from Raoyang County, Hebei Province. She was a Chinese ethicist who held the positions of researcher and deputy director at the Institute of Philosophy of the Chinese Academy of Social Sciences (CASS), was among the inaugural honorary members of CASS, and served as the first president of the Chinese Society of Ethics.

== Biography ==
In September 1935, Li Qi enrolled in the Education Department of Beiping Normal University, participated in the December 9th Movement, and joined the Chinese Communist Party at the end of December 1935. In December 1938, Li Qi was dispatched to the Yan'an Institute of Marxism-Leninism to study under intellectuals including Ai Siqi, Wang Xuewen, and Wu Liping. In May 1940, Li Qi served as an editor and reviewer in the Publication Department of the Central Committee of the Chinese Communist Party, during which she engaged in the review and proofreading of the Selected Works of Lenin and other seminal Marxist texts. Following the triumph in the Anti-Japanese War, Li Qi departed Yan'an with her forces and subsequently held the position of principal at several secondary schools in Chengde, Hebei Province. In August 1949, she was designated as a member of the Standing Committee of the CCP Jilin Municipal Committee and Minister of the Publicity Department.

In the early 1960s, Li Qi assembled a team of ethics researchers, founded an ethics section within the Historical Materialism Research Room of the Institute of Philosophy of the Chinese Academy of Sciences, and commenced supervising postgraduate students. In the autumn of 1964, Liu Qilin and Shi Yubin, the inaugural cohort of ethics postgraduates in New China, joined the ethics group at the Institute of Philosophy. In 1991, she was awarded a special governmental stipend by the State Council. In 2006, she was appointed an Honorary Academic Member of the Chinese Academy of Social Sciences. She died in Beijing on November 17, 2009, at the age of 96.
