= Xiaodong Liang =

Chinese-Canadian power engineer

Xiaodong Liang is a Chinese-Canadian power engineer, and a professor of electrical and computer engineering at the University of Saskatchewan, where she holds the Canada Research Chair in Technology Solutions for Energy Security in Remote, Northern, and Indigenous Communities and directs the Power and Energy Conversion Laboratory. Her research interests include power systems, smart grids, and the integration of renewable energy sources into power grids. She is the editor-in-chief of the IEEE Canadian Journal of Electrical and Computer Engineering.

== Education and career ==
Liang was a lecturer at Northeastern University in Shenyang, China, from 1995 to 1999. After emigrating to Canada, she worked as an engineer for Schlumberger in Edmonton, Alberta from 2001 to 2013. She completed a Ph.D. through the University of Alberta in 2013.

Next, she joined Washington State University Vancouver in Vancouver, Washington as an assistant professor in the School of Engineering and Computer Science, from 2013 to 2015. Returning to Canada, she became an assistant professor at the Memorial University of Newfoundland in 2015, and was promoted to associate professor before moving to the University of Saskatchewan in 2019. She was given a tier 2 Canada Research Chair in Technology Solutions for Energy Security in Remote, Northern, and Indigenous Communities in 2020, and was promoted to full professor in 2023.

After serving as co-editor-in-chief of the IEEE Canadian Journal of Electrical and Computer Engineering since 2025, she became editor-in-chief in 2026.

== Recognition ==
Liang is a Fellow of the Institution of Engineering and Technology. She was named to the 2026 class of IEEE Fellows, "for contributions to the protection of power systems and the analysis of electrical submersible pump systems".
