= Marta Molinas =

Paraguayan electrical engineer

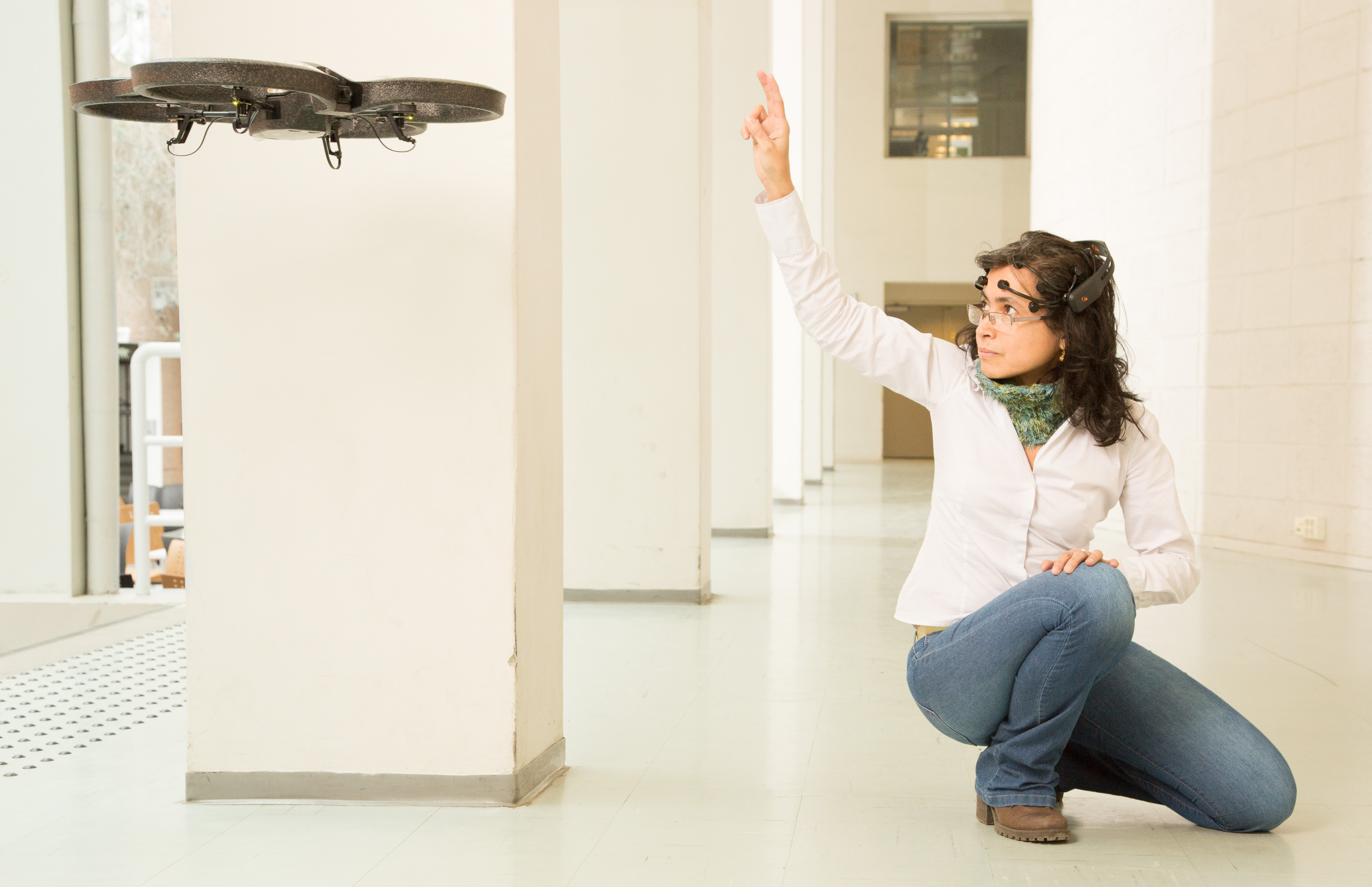
Molinas using a brain interface to control the flight of a drone

María Marta Molinas Cabrera (born 1968) is a Paraguayan electrical engineer, educated in Japan, who works in Norway as a professor of engineering cybernetics at the Norwegian University of Science and Technology (NTNU).

== Research ==
Molinas has performed research on the control theory and stability of power electronics, and harmonics in electrical power.

She is also interested in signal processing for electroencephalography (EEG). Her research in this area has led to the development of systems for controlling drones or other objects using brain signals, and she hopes to use her work on brain signals not only to read information from brains but to provide therapies for attention deficit disorders, sleep disorders, and pain management.

== Education and career ==
Molinas grew up in Argentina and Paraguay, and completed a diploma in electromechanical engineering at the Universidad Nacional de Asunción in 1992. She earned a master's degree in engineering from the University of the Ryukyus in 1997, with a master's thesis on Enhancement of Power System Stability based on the Application of Series Capacitors. She completed a doctorate (Dr. Eng.) from the Tokyo Institute of Technology in 2000. Her dissertation was Power System Stability Control based on Phase Angle Regulation.

After working as a guest researcher at the University of Padova and a postdoctoral researcher at NTNU, she joined the NTNU faculty in 2008.

== Recognition ==
Molinas is a member of the Royal Norwegian Society of Sciences and Letters. She was elected as an IEEE Fellow, in the 2023 class of fellows, "for contributions to modeling and stability of power electronics".
