= Qi Prefecture (Hebei) =

Historical administrative division of China

Qizhou
- Chinese: 祁州
- Postal: Chichow
Transcriptions
Standard Mandarin
- Hanyu Pinyin: Qízhōu
- Wade–Giles: Ch'i^{2}-chou^{1}

Qizhou or Qi Prefecture (Chinese: 祁州) was a zhou (prefecture) in imperial China centering on modern Anguo, Hebei, China. It existed from 893 until 1913.

== Geography ==
The administrative region of Qizhou in the Tang dynasty is in central Hebei. It probably includes parts of modern:

- Under the administration of Baoding:
  - Anguo
  - Dingzhou
- Under the administration of Shijiazhuang:
  - Shenze County
  - Jinzhou
  - Wuji County
