= Karen Butler-Purry =

American electrical engineer and academic administrator

Karen L. Butler-Purry is an American electrical engineer, engineering educator, and academic administrator. Her research has involved electrical microgrids and the distribution of electricity in electric vehicles. Formerly the Associate Provost for Graduate and Professional Studies and Dean of the Graduate and Professional School at Texas A&M University, she retains a position at Texas A&M as a professor in the Department of Electrical and Computer Engineering.

Butler-Purry is African-American, and has written about her experiences as an African-American woman in engineering.

== Education and career ==
Butler-Purry majored in electrical engineering at Southern University, a historically black school in Baton Rouge, Louisiana, graduating summa cum laude in 1985. After earning a master's degree in 1987 from the University of Texas at Austin, she went to Howard University for doctoral study, completing her Ph.D. in 1994. During this period she also held short-term positions at the MIT Lincoln Laboratory, IBM, Hughes Aircraft Company, and Los Angeles Department of Water and Power.

She came to Texas A&M University as a visiting assistant professor in 1994, and became a tenure-track assistant professor in 1995. In 2001, she was promoted to associate professor, also becoming assistant dean for graduate programs in the College of Engineering. She was promoted to full professor in 2005, and served as Associate Provost for Graduate and Professional Studies and Dean of the Graduate and Professional School from 2010 to 2022.

== Recognition ==
Butler-Purry was the 2005 recipient of the Mentor Award of the American Association for the Advancement of Science, for her "extraordinary leadership in mentoring and securing funding to foster Ph.D. careers for underrepresented students in electrical engineering and computer sciences". She was elected as an IEEE Fellow, in the 2018 class of fellows, "for contributions to expanding minority participation in power systems education". In 2021, the Council of Graduate Schools gave Butler-Purry their Debra Stewart Award for Outstanding Leadership in Graduate Education.

== Personal life ==
In 2000, Butler-Purry married Ralph Purry, a retired sergeant in the United States Marine Corps. He died in January 2023.
