= Yonghong Chen =

Chinese-American operations researcher and electrical engineer

Yonghong Chen is a Chinese-American operations researcher and electrical engineer who works as a chief scientist at the National Renewable Energy Laboratory in Golden, Colorado. Her research involves the application of mathematical optimization to market design and operations of electric power transmission.

== Education and career ==
Chen earned a bachelor's degree in electrical engineering from Southeast University in Nanjing in 1990, and a master's degree from the Nanjing Automation Research Institute in 1993. After continuing to work at the Nanjing Automation Research Institute from 1993 to 1998, she completed a PhD in electrical engineering at Washington State University in 2001. Her dissertation, Development of automatic slow voltage control for large power systems, was supervised by Mani V. Venkatasubramanian. She also has an Master of Business Administration from the Kelley School of Business at Indiana University Bloomington.

From 2001 to 2002 worked for GridSouth TransCo, a regional power transmission company formed in 2000 by combining assets from three smaller companies in North and South Carolina. GridSouth failed in 2002, and she moved to the Midcontinent Independent System Operator (MISO). After over 20 years at MISO, she moved to her present position at the National Renewable Energy Laboratory.

== Recognition ==
Chen received the Franz Edelman Award of INFORMS in 2011 for her work on optimization in market design at MISO. She was elected as an IEEE Fellow in 2023, "for contributions in wholesale electricity market design and operations".
