= Maria Cristina Tavares =

Brazilian electrical engineer

Maria Cristina Dias Tavares
- Citizenship: Brazil
- Education: Federal University of Rio de Janeiro
- Occupations: Electrical engineer, University professor, Researcher
- Years active: 1984–present
- Employer: University of Campinas
- Known for: Contributions to single-phase and three-phase automatic reclosing of transmission lines
- Title: Full Professor
- Awards: IEEE Fellow (2024)
- Website: www.dsce.fee.unicamp.br/~cristina/index.ing.html

Maria Cristina Dias Tavares is a Brazilian electrical engineer specializing in long-distance electric power transmission and the characteristics of transmission lines. She is a professor of electrical engineering at the State University of Campinas in Brazil.

== Education and career ==
Tavares earned a degree in electrical engineering in 1984 at the Federal University of Rio de Janeiro (UFRJ). She received a master's degree in 1991 at COPPE, the Alberto Luiz Coimbra Institute for Graduate Studies and Research in Engineering of UFRJ, and completed a doctorate (D. Sc.) in 1998 at the State University of Campinas.

After postdoctoral research at the University of São Paulo, Tavares joined the faculty of electrical engineering and computation at the State University of Campinas in 2002. She became an associate professor there in 2008 and was promoted to full professor in 2023.

== Recognition ==
Tavares was named as an IEEE Fellow in 2024, "for contributions to single-phase and three-phase auto-reclosing switching of transmission lines".
