= Javier Contreras (engineer) =

Spanish engineer

Javier Contreras is an engineer at the University of Castilla–La Mancha, Ciudad Real, Spain. He was named Fellow of the Institute of Electrical and Electronics Engineers (IEEE) in 2015 for contributions to modeling and forecasting of electricity markets.
