= Vaithianathan Venkatasubramanian =

Electrical engineer in Washington, US

Vaithianathan Venkatasubramanian is an electrical engineer at Washington State University in Pullman, Washington. He was named a Fellow of the Institute of Electrical and Electronics Engineers (IEEE) in 2015 for his contributions to online detection of oscillatory behavior of electric power systems.
