= James Jodice =

American engineer

James "Jerry" A. Jodice is an American engineer from J. A. Jodice & Associates, Manchester-by-the-Sea, Massachusetts. He was named Fellow of the Institute of Electrical and Electronics Engineers (IEEE) in 2015 for contributions to the testing of protective relays.
