= Veronika Rabl =

Slovak-American energy expert

Veronika Ariana Rabl (born 16 December 1945) is a Slovak-American energy expert, a leader in the development of residential demand response modeling, smart buildings, and the integration of renewable energy into transportation and power distribution systems. After working at the Electric Power Research Institute, she is an independent consultant to the energy industry.

== Education and career ==
Rabl was born on 16 December 1945 in Michalovce, now in Slovakia. Her parents survived the Holocaust by hiding in the mountains, but most of the rest of her family were killed, and her father, an engineer, died when she was ten. In the summer of 1968, while studying nuclear engineering at Charles University in Prague, she traveled to Israel to visit a cousin. She became a refugee after the Warsaw Pact invasion of Czechoslovakia ended the Prague Spring during her visit. Despite not having finished her undergraduate degree, she was accepted to a master's program in physics at the Weizmann Institute of Science. After earning her master's degree in 1971, she moved to the University of Bonn with her new husband (a postdoctoral researcher at the Weizmann Institute) and completed a Ph.D. at Ohio State University in 1974.

After postdoctoral research at Syracuse University, Rabl became a researcher at the Argonne National Laboratory, shifting her focus there from physics to power engineering. She worked at the Electric Power Research Institute from 1981 until 2000, becoming its General Manager and Director. She has also chaired the IEEE-USA Energy Policy Committee.

== Recognition ==
Rabl was the 2022 recipient of the John Meredith Professional Service Award of the IEEE. She was named an IEEE Fellow, in the 2024 class of fellows, "for contributions to the design of demand response resources and electrification".
