= Joydeep Mitra =

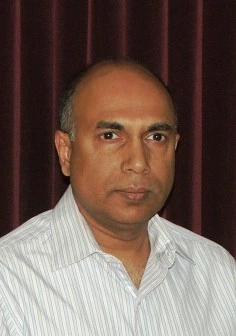
- Mitra (2014)
- Awards: IEEE Fellow

Academic background
- Education: Texas A&M University, Indian Institutes of Technology
- Thesis: Models for Reliability Evaluation of Multi-Area and Composite Systems (1997)

Joydeep Mitra is MSU Foundation Professor of Electrical Engineering at Michigan State University, where he is the Director of the Energy Reliability and Security (ERiSe) Laboratory at Michigan State University. He was elected as a Fellow of the IEEE in 2019 for "contributions to the development of power system reliability methods."

== Academic career ==
Mitra grew up in India and earned his BS in Electrical Engineering from the Indian Institute of Technology, Kharagpur in 1989. He went on to earn a Ph.D. in Electrical Engineering from Texas A&M University, College Station, with a dissertation titled Models for reliability evaluation of multi-area and composite systems.

Mitra's research focuses on power system modeling, analysis, stability, control, planning, and simulation. He has contributed to power system reliability analysis and reliability-based planning. His work includes over 250 publications and patents in the field of power systems. He is also the co-author of the book Electric Power Grid Reliability Evaluation: Models and Methods and contributed to the development of IEEE Standard 762, which addresses reliability reporting.

== Selected works ==
- Electric Power Grid Reliability Evaluation: Models and Methods with C. Singh and P. Jirutitijaroen. Wiley-IEEE, Hoboken, NJ: 2019.
- IEEE Std. 762 Working Group, "IEEE Standard 762-2006: IEEE Standard Definitions for Use in Reporting Electric Generating Unit Reliability, Availability and Productivity." IEEE, Piscataway, NJ: 2006. (Co-author.)
