= Anguo =

County-level city in Hebei, China

Anguo 安国市 Ankwo
- County-level city
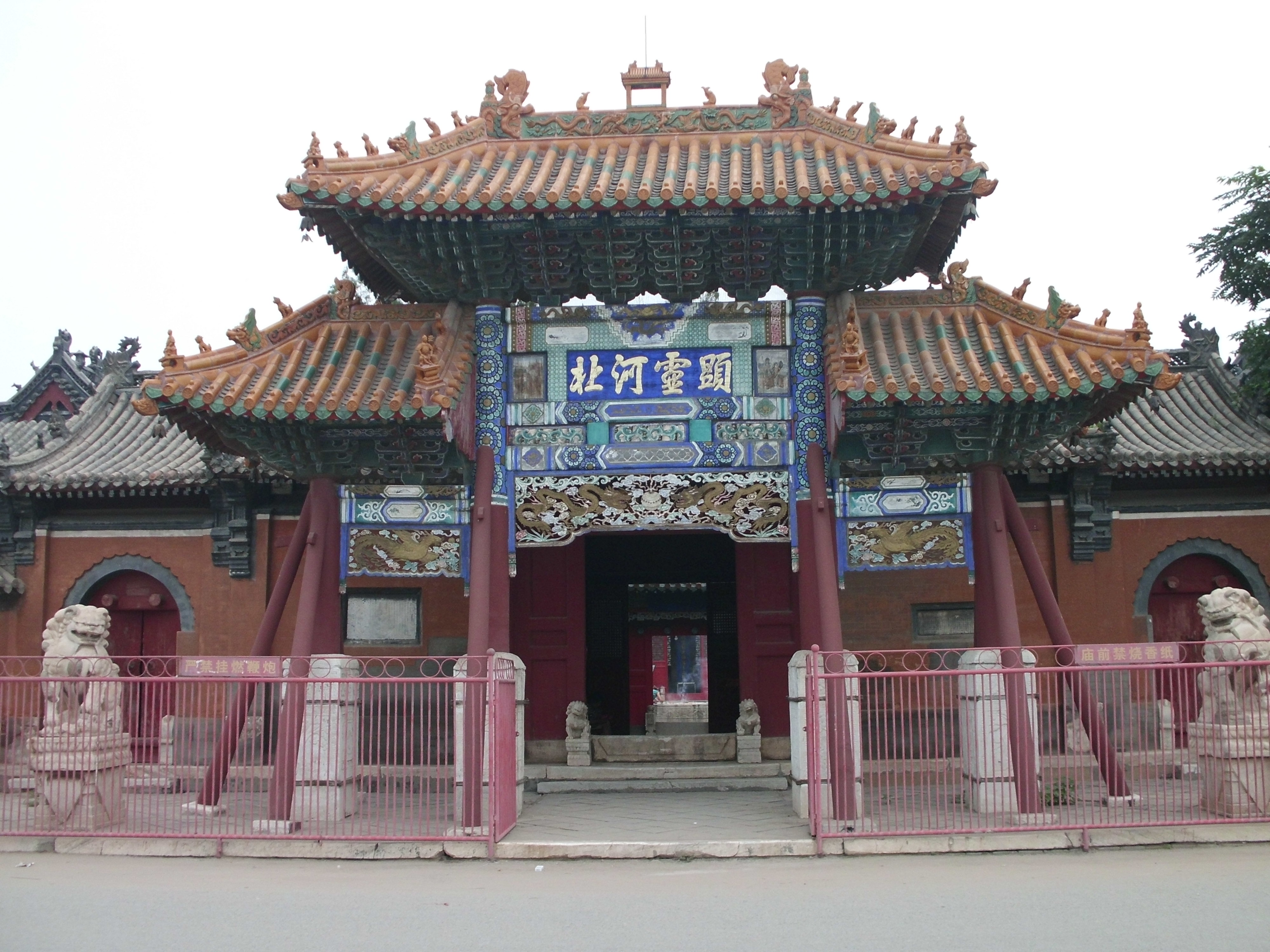
- Temple for the God of Medicine

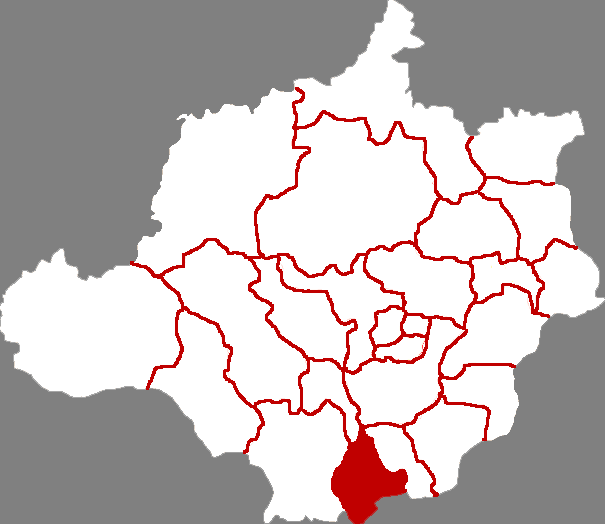
- Location in Baoding

- Location in Hebei
- Coordinates: 38°25′05″N 115°19′37″E
- Country: People's Republic of China
- Province: Hebei
- Prefecture-level city: Baoding

Area
  - County-level city: 485.1 km^{2} (187.3 sq mi)
  - Urban: 81.00 km^{2} (31.27 sq mi)
- Elevation: 33 m (108 ft)

Population (2017)
  - County-level city: 415,000
  - Density: 855/km^{2} (2,220/sq mi)
  - Urban: 109,800
- Time zone: UTC+8 (China Standard)
- Postal code: 071200
- Area code: 0312
- Website: anguo.gov.cn

Anguo
- Simplified Chinese: 安国
- Traditional Chinese: 安國
- Postal: Ankwo
Transcriptions
Standard Mandarin
- Hanyu Pinyin: Ānguó
- Wade–Giles: An^{1}-kuo^{2}

Qizhou
- Chinese: 祁州
- Postal: Chichow
Transcriptions
Standard Mandarin
- Hanyu Pinyin: Qízhōu
- Wade–Giles: Ch'i^{2}-chou^{1}

Anguo (simplified Chinese: 安国; traditional Chinese: 安國; pinyin: Ānguó), nicknamed "Medicine Capital" (药都), is a county-level city under the administration of and 52 kilometres (32 mi) south of Baoding, central Hebei province, China.

It has a provincially protected Temple of the God of Medicine (藥王廟) established around 100.

In premodern China, Anguo was Qizhou (Chinese: 祁州; pinyin: Qízhōu). In 1991, Anguo was changed from county into a city. The city governs 20 town-level entities in 486 km^{2} (188 sq mi), of which the centrally placed Yaocheng (药城; Yàochéng) is the municipal seat. The Chinese playwright Guan Hanqing was born here.

== Administrative divisions ==
Subdistricts:

- Qizhouyaoshi Subdistrict (祁州药市街道)

Towns:

- Qizhou (祁州镇), Wurenqiao (伍仁桥镇), Shifo (石佛镇), Zhengzhang (郑章镇), Xifoluo (西佛落镇), Dawunü (大五女镇)

Townships:

- Mingguandian Township (明官店乡), Nanloudi Township (南娄底乡), Xi'anguocheng Township (西安国城乡), Beiduancun Township (北段村乡)

== Climate ==
Climate data for Anguo, elevation 31 m (102 ft), (1991–2020 normals, extremes 1981–present)
Month	Jan	Feb	Mar	Apr	May	Jun	Jul	Aug	Sep	Oct	Nov	Dec	Year
Record high °C (°F)	16.8 (62.2)	23.6 (74.5)	31.0 (87.8)	33.7 (92.7)	39.4 (102.9)	42.3 (108.1)	42.3 (108.1)	36.5 (97.7)	35.6 (96.1)	31.4 (88.5)	24.1 (75.4)	19.2 (66.6)	42.3 (108.1)
Mean daily maximum °C (°F)	3.1 (37.6)	7.3 (45.1)	14.5 (58.1)	21.7 (71.1)	27.4 (81.3)	32.0 (89.6)	32.4 (90.3)	30.6 (87.1)	26.8 (80.2)	20.5 (68.9)	11.2 (52.2)	4.5 (40.1)	19.3 (66.8)
Daily mean °C (°F)	−2.9 (26.8)	0.9 (33.6)	7.8 (46.0)	15.1 (59.2)	21.0 (69.8)	25.7 (78.3)	27.3 (81.1)	25.7 (78.3)	20.8 (69.4)	13.9 (57.0)	5.3 (41.5)	−1.0 (30.2)	13.3 (55.9)
Mean daily minimum °C (°F)	−7.5 (18.5)	−3.9 (25.0)	2.1 (35.8)	9.0 (48.2)	14.9 (58.8)	20.0 (68.0)	22.9 (73.2)	21.7 (71.1)	16.0 (60.8)	8.7 (47.7)	0.8 (33.4)	−5.1 (22.8)	8.3 (46.9)
Record low °C (°F)	−20.0 (−4.0)	−7.4 (18.7)	−9.8 (14.4)	−3.1 (26.4)	4.2 (39.6)	9.1 (48.4)	14.8 (58.6)	12.0 (53.6)	5.4 (41.7)	−4.2 (24.4)	−13.7 (7.3)	−20.8 (−5.4)	−20.8 (−5.4)
Average precipitation mm (inches)	2.0 (0.08)	4.5 (0.18)	7.9 (0.31)	25.6 (1.01)	32.2 (1.27)	61.8 (2.43)	131.0 (5.16)	120.6 (4.75)	51.4 (2.02)	25.7 (1.01)	13.3 (0.52)	2.2 (0.09)	478.2 (18.83)
Average precipitation days (≥ 0.1 mm)	1.5	2.1	2.9	4.7	6.0	8.2	11.1	10.1	6.2	4.8	3.6	1.4	62.6
Average snowy days	2.6	2.5	1.0	0.2	0	0	0	0	0	0	1.3	2.5	10.1
Average relative humidity (%)	56	52	49	53	58	60	74	78	73	66	66	60	62
Mean monthly sunshine hours	159.4	164.2	216.9	241.0	267.4	238.0	205.6	206.3	201.1	188.6	156.1	156.5	2,401.1
Percentage possible sunshine	52	54	58	61	60	54	46	49	55	55	52	53	54
Source: China Meteorological Administration

== Notable people ==
- Mo Menchuan, Chinese politician and academician
