= Rambabu Adapa =

American electrical engineer

Rambabu Adapa from the Electric Power Research Institute (EPRI), Palo Alto, California was named Fellow of the Institute of Electrical and Electronics Engineers (IEEE) in 2012 for leadership in DC and flexible AC transmission systems.
