= IEEE Power & Energy Society =

Society of IEEE

- Formation: 1884 As Power Group (Later in 1964 it become the first full Society of IEEE)
- Type: Technical professional society
- Headquarters: Piscataway, New Jersey, U.S.
- Members: 37035 members
- Affiliations: 230 Chapters
- Website: www.ieee-pes.org

The IEEE Power & Energy Society (IEEE PES), formerly the IEEE Power Engineering Society, is the oldest society of the Institute of Electrical and Electronics Engineers (IEEE) focused on the scientific and engineering knowledge about electric power and energy.

== PES Technical Council ==
On 14 January 2016, the IEEE PES Governing Board approved the PES Technical Committee reorganization. This resulted in twenty coordinating and technical committees as follows:

- Intelligent Grid and Emerging Technologies Coordinating Committee
- Marine Systems Coordinating Committee
- Wind and Solar Power Coordinating Committee

=== Technical Committees ===
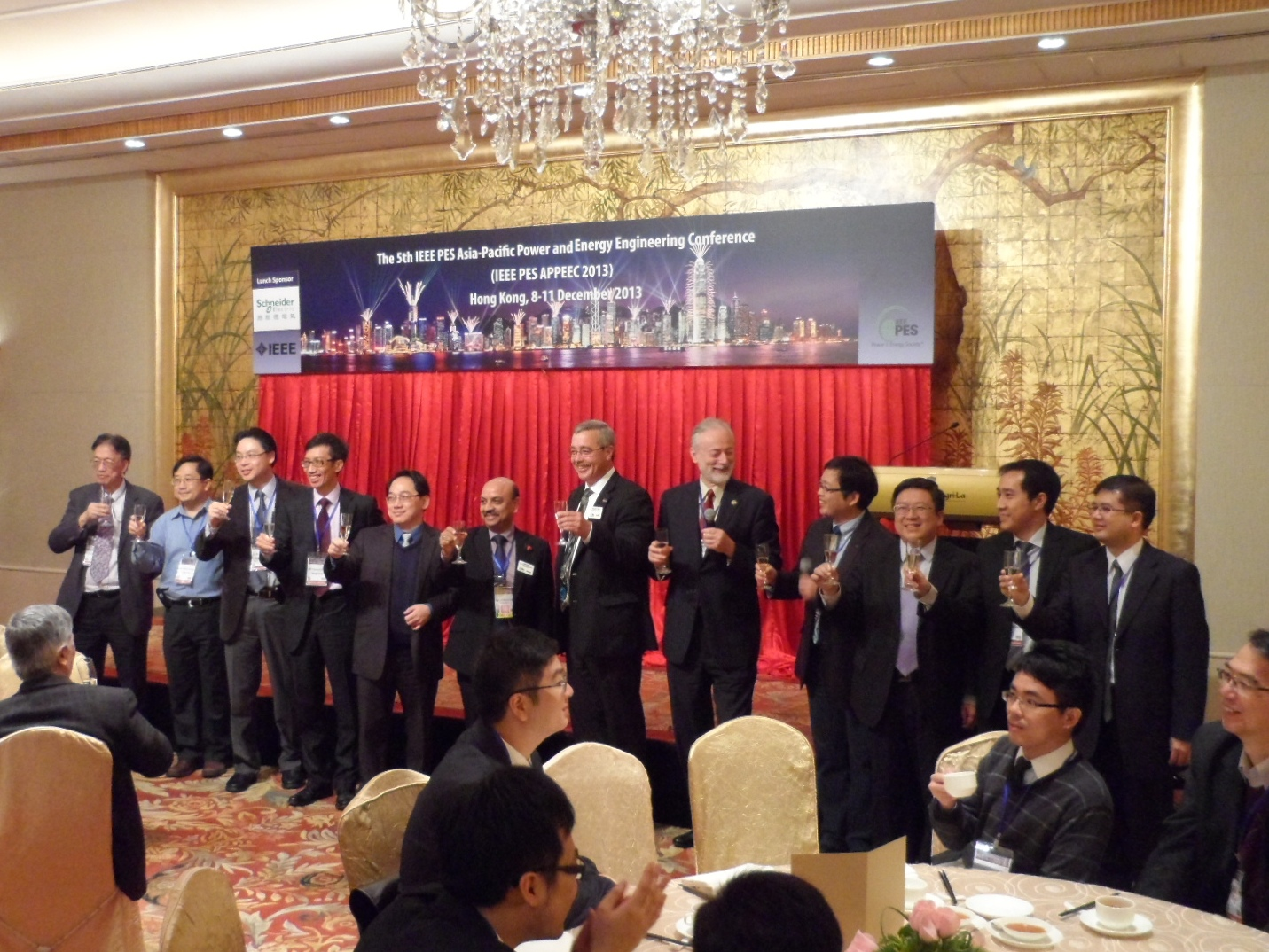
The 5th IEEE PES Asia-Pacific Power & Energy Engineering Conference 2013 in Hong Kong, China.

- Analytics Methods for Power Systems Committee
- Electric Machinery Committee
- Energy Development and Power Generation Committee
- Energy Storage and Stationary Battery Committee
- Insulated Conductors Committee
- Nuclear Power Engineering Committee
- Power System Communications and Cybersecurity Committee
- Power System Dynamic Performance Committee
- Power System Instrumentation and Measurements Committee
- Power System Operations, Planning and Economics Committee
- Power System Relaying and Control Committee
- Smart Buildings, Loads and Customer Systems Committee
- Substations Committee
- Surge Protective Devices Committee
- Switchgear Committee
- Transformers Committee
- Transmission and Distribution Committee

== Publications ==
- IEEE Transactions on Energy Conversion
- IEEE Transactions on Power Delivery
- IEEE Transactions on Power Systems
- IEEE Transactions on Sustainable Energy
- IEEE Electrification Magazine
- IEEE Transactions on Smart Grid
- IEEE Power & Energy Magazine

== Conferences ==
The society sponsors a number of annual conferences that focus on its fields of interest. The principal events by IEEE PES are:

- IEEE PES General Meeting (www.pes-gm.org)
- IEES PES T&D (https://ieeet-d.org/)
- IEEE PES ISGT Series of events
