= List of members of the National Academy of Engineering (electric power and energy systems) =

This list is a subsection of the List of members of the National Academy of Engineering, which includes members and international members of the United States National Academy of Engineering, living and deceased, each affiliated with one of the academy's disciplinary sections. Members are listed under their primary section, and each entry gives the person's name, primary institution, and election year. For deceased members, the year of death is noted.

== Electric Power/Energy Systems ==
Name	Institution	Year elected
Ali Abur	Northeastern University	2023
Mark G. Adamiak	Adamiak Consulting LLC	2012
John F. Ahearne (died 2019)	Sigma Xi, The Scientific Research Society	1996
Pierre M. Ailleret (died 1996)	Technical Union for Electricity of France	1977
Hirofumi Akagi	Institute of Science Tokyo	2025
Fred W. Albaugh (died 1999)	Pacific Northwest National Laboratory	1978
William F. Allen (died 2014)	Stone & Webster, Inc.	1986
Ongun Alsaç	Independent Consultant	2018
John G. Anderson (died 2024)	Independent Consultant	1979
Paul M. Anderson (died 2011)	Power Math Associates	2009
C. Göran Andersson	ETH Zurich	2016
Yoshio Ando (died 2007)	The University of Tokyo	1978
Arnaldo M. Angelini (died 1999)	National Electric Power Systems of Italy	1976
Stig A. Annestrand (died 2018)	Bonneville Power Administration	1989
George Apostolakis	Massachusetts Institute of Technology	2007
Alexander Apostolov	OMICRON Electronics	2025
David H. Archer (died 2010)	Westinghouse Electric Corporation	1989
Wm. Howard Arnold (died 2015)	Westinghouse Electric Corporation	1974
Dan E. Arvizu	New Mexico State University	2014
T. Louis Austin Jr. (died 1997)	Brown & Root International, Inc.	1979
Robert Avery (died 2004)	Argonne National Laboratory	1978
Charles F. Avila (died 2000)	Boston Edison Company	1968
Richard E. Balzhiser (died 2012)	Electric Power Research Institute	1994
S. George Bankoff (died 2011)	Northwestern University - Evanston	1996
Philip Barkan (died 1996)	Stanford University	1980
Howard C. Barnes (died 2003)	American Electric Power Company, Inc.	1974
Seymour Baron (died 2022)	Medical University of South Carolina	1980
Lionel O. Barthold (died 2025)	Power Technologies, Inc.	1981
John W. Batchelor (died 2012)	Westinghouse Electric Corporation	1980
Roy H. Beaton (died 2007)	GE Nuclear Energy	1977
Wallace B. Behnke (died 2022)	Commonwealth Edison Company	1980
Manson Benedict (died 2006)	Massachusetts Institute of Technology	1967
Murty P. Bhavaraju	PJM Interconnection, LLC	2013
Gurumoorthy Bhuvaneswari	Mahindra University	2022
Jessica Bian	RAS Fusion	2025
Roy Billinton (died 2025)	University of Saskatchewan	2007
J. Lewis Blackburn (died 1997)	Independent Consultant	1997
Vladimir Blasko	Lockheed Martin Corporation	2023
W. Spencer Bloor (died 2002)	Independent Consultant	1979
Pierre Bornard	BSDE Associates	2024
Dushan Boroyevich	Virginia Polytechnic Institute and State University	2014
Anjan Bose	Washington State University	2003
Bimal K. Bose	The University of Tennessee, Knoxville	2017
Terry Boston	Terry Boston LLC	2014
Vincent S. Boyer (died 2001)	Independent Consultant	1980
Donald A. Brand	Pacific Gas and Electric Company	1990
A. Philip Bray (died 2005)	General Electric Company	1979
Gordon S. Brown (died 1996)	Massachusetts Institute of Technology	1965
Marilyn Ann Brown	Georgia Institute of Technology	2020
Howard J. Bruschi	Westinghouse Electric Company	2008
Robert Jay Budnitz	Lawrence Berkeley National Laboratory	2017
Jacopo Buongiorno	Massachusetts Institute of Technology	2024
Sol Burstein (died 2002)	Wisconsin Electric Power Company	1985
James D. Callen	University of Wisconsin-Madison	1990
Max William Carbon (died 2021)	University of Wisconsin-Madison	2012
Roy W. Carlson (died 1990)	Independent Consultant	1974
Melvin W. Carter (died 2007)	Independent Consultant	1999
William Cavanaugh III	University of South Florida	2001
Babu R. Chalamala	The University of Texas at Dallas	2024
Douglas M. Chapin (died 2024)	MPR Associates, Inc.	2002
Patrick Chapman	Enphase Energy, Inc.	2025
Vernon L. Chartier	Bonneville Power Administration	2004
Anil Chaudhry	Schneider Electric India Pvt Ltd	2025
Kwok Wai Cheung	KC-Exousia Consulting	2025
William A. Chittenden (died 2018)	Sargent & Lundy	1987
Joe Hong Chow	Rensselaer Polytechnic Institute	2017
Margaret Sze-Tai Y. Chu	M. S. Chu + Associates LLC	2018
KunMo Chung	Korea Electric Power Corporation	1998
Philip R. Clark (died 2018)	GPU Nuclear Corporation	1993
Bernard L. Cohen (died 2012)	University of Pittsburgh	2003
Karl P. Cohen (died 2012)	General Electric Company	1967
Umberto P. Colombo (died 2006)	Italian National Council for the Economy and Labor	1989
Charles Concordia (died 2003)	Independent Consultant	1978
Antonio J. Conejo	The Ohio State University	2024
Robert W. Conn	The Kavli Foundation	1987
Michael L. Corradini	University of Wisconsin-Madison	1998
Robert J. Creagan (died 2014)	Westinghouse Electric Corporation	1981
Floyd L. Culler (died 2004)	Electric Power Research Institute	1974
Thomas W. Dakin (died 1990)	Independent Consultant	1981
Erroll Brown Davis Jr. (died 2026)	University System of Georgia	2021
Lewis Berkley Davis Jr.	GE Power & Water	2006
Rik W. De Doncker	RWTH Aachen University	2026
F. Paul de Mello (died 2022)	Independent Consultant	1984
E. Gail de Planque (died 2010)	Strategy Matters, Inc.	1995
Robert W. Deutsch (died 2019)	RWD Technologies, Inc.	1995
Deepakraj M. Divan	Georgia Institute of Technology	2015
John E. Dolan (died 2018)	American Electric Power Service Corporation	1980
John J. Dorning	University of Virginia	2007
E. Linn Draper Jr.	American Electric Power Company, Inc.	1992
Milton C. Edlund (died 1993)	Virginia Polytechnic Institute and State University	1976
Gabriel Chike Ejebe	Open Access Technology International, Inc.	2018
Sigvard Eklund (died 2000)	International Atomic Energy Agency	1979
Frederick J. Ellert (died 2005)	General Electric Company	1987
Walter A. Elmore (died 2010)	ABB Power T&D Company, Inc.	1998
Per Gunnar Engström (died 2015)	Asea AB	1992
Robert Warren Erickson Jr.	University of Colorado Boulder	2026
James L. Everett III (died 2018)	PECO Energy	1974
Bruce Behruz Fardanesh	New York Power Authority	2024
Richard Gregg Farmer (died 2012)	Arizona State University	2006
Hans K. Fauske (died 2021)	Fauske and Associates, Inc.	2016
John C. Fisher (died 2018)	GE Corporate Research and Development	1981
Karl N. Fleming	KNF Consulting Services LLC	2020
Raymond John Fonck	University of Wisconsin-Madison	2015
John S. Forrest (died 1992)	University of Strathclyde	1979
Harold K. Forsen (died 2012)	Bechtel Corporation	1989
Vladimir E. Fortov (died 2020)	Russian Academy of Sciences	2002
Abdel-Aziz A. Fouad (died 2017)	Iowa State University	1996
B. John Garrick (died 2020)	University of California, Los Angeles	1993
Charles F. Gay	Greenstar Foundation	2013
Eric Gebhardt	Wabtec Corporation	2020
Clark W. Gellings P.E.	Clark Gellings and Associates, LLC	2016
Ralph S. Gens (died 2019)	Bonneville Power Administration	1983
Andre Y. Giraud (died 1997)	Independent Consultant	1977
Jay Giri	GGM Consulting	2017
William R. Gould (died 2006)	Southern California Edison Company	1973
John E. Gray (died 1997)	Atlantic Council of the United States	1992
Elias P. Gyftopoulos (died 2012)	Massachusetts Institute of Technology	1981
Wolf Hafele (died 2013)	Rossendorf Inc.	1977
Lawrence R. Hafstad (died 1993)	General Motors Corporation	1968
Kenneth W. Hamming (died 2005)	Sargent & Lundy	1974
Kent F. Hansen	Massachusetts Institute of Technology	1982
Kiruba Sivasubramaniam Haran	University of Illinois Urbana-Champaign	2024
Edwin L. Harder (died 2004)	Westinghouse Electric Corporation	1976
Dean B. Harrington (died 2017)	General Electric Company	1981
Yassin A. Hassan	Texas A&M University	2019
Arthur Hauspurg (died 2003)	Consolidated Edison Company of New York	1976
Joseph M. Hendrie (died 2023)	Brookhaven National Laboratory	1976
Dennis Wayne Henneke	GE Vernova, formerly GE Hitachi Nuclear Energy	2024
Allan F. Henry (died 2001)	Massachusetts Institute of Technology	1985
Robert E. Henry	Fauske and Associates, Inc.	2015
Gerald Thomas Heydt	Arizona State University	1997
Andrew R. Hileman (died 2012)	Independent Consultant	1999
George R. Hill (died 2001)	University of Utah	1989
John Hill (died 2008)	U.K. Atomic Energy Authority	1976
Narain G. Hingorani	Independent Consultant	1988
John P. Holdren	Harvard University	2000
Charles H. Holley (died 2012)	General Electric Company	1976
Stanley H. Horowitz (died 2022)	Independent Consultant	1995
Bahman Hoveida	Accurant International, LLC	2022
Hao Huang	University of Houston	2021
Michel Hug (died 2019)	Design Statégique SARL	1979
Marija D. Ilic	Massachusetts Institute of Technology	2021
Susan Elizabeth Ion	Independent Consultant	2012
James F. Jackson	Los Alamos National Laboratory	1991
Kathryn J. Jackson	Dr. Kathryn Jackson, LLC	2021
Linos J. Jacovides	Michigan State University	2011
Robert I. Jaffee (died 1991)	Electric Power Research Institute	1969
Thomas M. Jahns	University of Wisconsin-Madison	2015
Gunnar Jancke (died 1996)	SwedPower AB	1977
I. Birger Johnson (died 2000)	Independent Consultant	1980
Woodrow E. Johnson (died 2015)	Westinghouse Electric Corporation	1968
Milan M. Jovanovic (died 2018)	Delta Products Corporation	2015
Frank D. Judge (died 2011)	GE Nuclear Energy	1988
Clyde Peter Jupiter (died 2024)	AZIsotopes	2023
John W. Kalb (died 2013)	The Ohio Brass Company	1980
Innocent Kamwa	Laval University	2023
Stanley Kaplan (died 2011)	Bayesian Systems, Inc.	1999
John G. Kassakian	Massachusetts Institute of Technology	1994
William E. Kastenberg	University of California, Berkeley	1997
Mujid S. Kazimi (died 2015)	Massachusetts Institute of Technology	2012
Lawrence L. Kazmerski	National Renewable Energy Laboratory	2005
Joseph Kestin (died 1993)	Brown University	1982
Mladen Kezunovic	Texas A&M University	2022
John R. Kiely (died 1996)	Bechtel Power Corporation	1967
Lee A. Kilgore (died 2000)	Independent Consultant	1976
Oliver Dowling Kingsley Jr.	Auburn University	2003
Edwin E. Kintner (died 2010)	GPU Nuclear Corporation	1990
James L. Kirtley Jr.	Massachusetts Institute of Technology	2007
Dale E. Klein	University of Texas at Austin	2025
Leonard J. Koch (died 2015)	Illinois Power Company	1981
Johann W. Kolar	ETH Zurich	2021
Herbert J. C. Kouts (died 2008)	Defense Nuclear Facilities Safety Board	1978
Philip T. Krein	University of Illinois Urbana-Champaign	2016
Gerald L. Kulcinski	University of Wisconsin-Madison	1993
Prabha S. Kundur (died 2018)	Kundur Power Systems Solutions Inc.	2011
Sarah Kurtz	University of California, Merced	2020
Richard T. Lahey Jr.	Rensselaer Polytechnic Institute	1994
A. Uno Lamm (died 1989)	Asea AB	1976
John W. Landis (died 2013)	Public Safety Standards Group	1981
Einar V. Larsen	GE Energy	2010
Kaye D. Lathrop (died 2021)	Stanford University	1986
Mark G. Lauby	North American Electric Reliability Corporation	2020
Nikolay P. Laverov (died 2016)	Russian Academy of Sciences	2005
Fred C. Lee	Virginia Polytechnic Institute and State University	2011
Thomas H. Lee (died 2001)	Center for Quality of Management	1975
William S. Lee (died 1996)	Duke Power Company	1978
Milton Levenson (died 2018)	Independent Consultant	1976
Miles C. Leverett (died 2001)	Independent Consultant	1984
Salomon Levy (died 2016)	No Affiliation	1974
W. Bennett Lewis (died 1987)	Atomic Energy of Canada, Ltd.	1976
Clarence H. Linder (died 1994)	General Electric Company	1964
Thomas A. Lipo (died 2020)	Florida State University	2008
Ludwig F. Lischer (died 2005)	Commonwealth Edison Company	1978
Eugene Litvinov (died 2020)	ISO New England	2020
Chen-Ching Liu	Virginia Tech	2020
Yilu Liu	University of Tennessee and Oak Ridge National Lab	2016
Walter B. Loewenstein (died 2018)	Independent Consultant	1991
Robert D. Lorenz (died 2019)	University of Wisconsin-Madison	2019
Maurice Magnien (died 2001)	Association for the History of Electricity in France	1979
William D. Magwood IV	Organization for Economic Cooperation and Development	2021
I. Harry Mandil (died 2006)	MPR Associates, Inc.	1998
George A. Maneatis (died 2018)	Pacific Gas and Electric Company	1988
James J. Markowsky	American Electric Power Service Corporation	1999
Walter Charles Marshall (died 1996)	World Association of Nuclear Operations (WANO)	1979
Kenneth Eugene Martin	EPG	2026
Nelson Martins	Electrical Energy Research Center (CEPEL)	2015
Ralph D. Masiello	Quanta Technology, LLC	2011
Kathryn Ann McCarthy	Oak Ridge National Laboratory	2019
Walter J. McCarthy Jr. (died 2013)	Detroit Edison Company	1984
John D. McDonald	JDM Associates, LLC	2022
Eugene R. McGrath	Consolidated Edison Company of New York	1991
William J. McNutt (died 2014)	Berkshire Transformer Consultants, Inc.	2000
George F. Mechlin (died 2003)	Westinghouse Electric Corporation	1971
Danielle W. Merfeld	Hanwha Q CELLS USA Corp.	2021
Richard A. Meserve	Carnegie Institution for Science	2003
Gennady Andreevich Mesyats	Russian Academy of Sciences	2012
Nicholas W. Miller	HickoryLedge LLC	2024
Warren F. Miller Jr.	The Texas A&M University System	1996
Ned Mohan (died 2024)	University of Minnesota, Minneapolis	2014
Sasan Mokhtari	Open Access Technology International, Inc.	2019
James Adeche Momoh	Nigerian Electricity Regulatory Commission	2020
Harry O. Monson (died 2007)	Argonne National Laboratory	1983
D. Bruce Montgomery (died 2022)	Magplane Technology	1998
Frederick J. Moody	Independent Consultant	2001
Ali Mosleh	University of California, Los Angeles	2010
Peter Murray (died 2009)	Westinghouse Electric Corporation	1976
Thomas J. Murrin (died 2012)	Fordham University	1984
Pyotr S. Neporozhny (died 1999)	Ministry of Power and Electrification of the USSR	1978
Kenneth D. Nichols (died 2000)	U.S. Department of the Army	1968
Damir Novosel	DaNovo Energy Solutions, LLC	2014
John H. Nuckolls	E.O. Lawrence Livermore National Laboratory	1992
Mark J. O'Malley	Imperial College London	2018
David Okrent (died 2012)	University of California, Los Angeles	1974
Donald R. Olander	University of California, Berkeley	2000
Thomas J. Overbye	Texas A&M University	2013
Warren H. Owen (died 2000)	Duke Power Company	1985
Hilliard W. Paige (died 2019)	General Electric Company	1968
Nunzio J. Palladino (died 1999)	The Pennsylvania State University - University Park	1967
Lawrence T. Papay (died 2014)	PQR, LLC	1987
Robert H. Park (died 1994)	Fast Load Control, Inc.	1986
Ronald R. Parker	Massachusetts Institute of Technology	1988
John Joseph Paserba Jr.	Southern States, LLC	2025
Zack T. Pate (died 2022)	World Association of Nuclear Operations (WANO)	1997
Fang Zheng Peng	University of Pittsburgh	2025
David J. Perreault	Massachusetts Institute of Technology	2021
Mark Todd Peters	MITRE Corporation	2021
Harold A. Peterson (died 2002)	University of Wisconsin-Madison	1978
Per F. Peterson	University of California, Berkeley	2020
David A. Petti	Idaho National Laboratory	2022
Arun G. Phadke	Virginia Polytechnic Institute and State University	1993
Thomas H. Pigford (died 2010)	University of California, Berkeley	1976
Ira J. Pitel	Magna-Power Electronics	2026
Milton S. Plesset (died 1991)	California Institute of Technology	1979
Martin Gerard Plys	Fauske and Associates, Inc.	2023
Robin Podmore	Incremental Systems Corp. (IncSys)	2013
Dana Auburn Powers	Sandia National Laboratories	2015
Richard B. Priory	Duke Energy Corporation	1994
Charles W. Pryor Jr.	Urenco USA	2003
Alvin Radkowsky (died 2002)	Radkowsky Thorium Power Corporation	1991
Kaushik Rajashekara	University of Houston	2012
Mylavarapu Ramamoorty	K L University, India	2019
Norman C. Rasmussen (died 2003)	Massachusetts Institute of Technology	1977
Wanda K. Reder	Reder Advisors, LLC (formerly Grid-X Partners, LLC)	2016
Cordell Reed (died 2017)	Commonwealth Edison Company	1992
Monica C. Regalbuto	Battelle Memorial Institute	2026
José N. Reyes Jr.	NuScale Power, LLC	2018
Theodore Rockwell (died 2013)	MPR Associates, Inc.	2001
Louis H. Roddis Jr. (died 1991)	Independent Consultant	1967
Denis Rooke (died 2008)	British Gas	1987
David W. Roop	DWR Associates, LLC	2018
Arthur H. Rosenfeld (died 2017)	E. O. Lawrence Berkeley National Laboratory	2010
Murray W. Rosenthal (died 2025)	Oak Ridge National Laboratory	1990
Philip N. Ross (died 2003)	Westinghouse Electric Corporation	1968
Adrian W. Roth (died 2012)	Academy of Technical Sciences of Switzerland	1990
Will H. Rowand (died 2001)	The Babcock & Wilcox Company	1968
Hugh Rudnick	No Affiliation	2019
B. Don Russell Jr.	Texas A&M University-College Station	1999
Shoichi Saba (died 2012)	Toshiba Corporation	1991
Eugene C. Sakshaug (died 2016)	Independent Consultant	1986
Peter William Sauer (died 2022)	University of Illinois Urbana-Champaign	2003
Harold N. Scherer Jr. (died 2017)	Commonwealth Electric Company	1989
Rudolf Schulten (died 1996)	Institute for Safety Research and Reactor Technique of Germany	1978
Edmund O. Schweitzer III	Schweitzer Engineering Laboratories, Inc.	2002
Tomy Sebastian	HL Mechatronics	2026
Bal Raj Sehgal (died 2018)	KTH-Royal Institute of Technology	2013
Claude P. Seippel (died 1986)	Asea Brown Boveri Ltd.	1984
Manoj R. Shah	Florida State University / FAMU-FSU College of Engineering	2022
Mohammad Shahidehpour	Illinois Institute of Technology	2016
Vera Silva	General Electric Company	2024
Massoud T. Simnad (died 2001)	University of California, San Diego	1995
John W. Simpson (died 2007)	Westinghouse Electric Corporation	1966
Chanan Singh	Texas A&M University	2018
Harold A. Smith (died 2000)	Ontario Hydro	1978
Sushil K. Soonee	Power System Operation Corporation Ltd. (POSOCO)	2018
Alexander Squire (died 2009)	Westinghouse Hanford Company	1979
Lombard Squires (died 2007)	E.I. du Pont de Nemours & Company	1967
Glenn W. Stagg (died 2009)	Independent Consultant	1997
Chauncey Starr (died 2007)	Electric Power Research Institute	1965
Francis M. Staszesky (died 2013)	Boston Edison Company	1979
Robert L. Steigerwald	General Electric Global Research Center	2016
Theodore Stern (died 2022)	Buyers United Inc.	1979
William D. Stevens (died 2007)	Foster Wheeler Corporation	1983
Henry E. Stone (died 2018)	Independent Consultant	1981
Brian Stott	Stott Inc.	2005
Virginia C. Sulzberger	North American Electric Reliability Corporation	2015
John H. Sununu	JHS Associates, Ltd.	1990
Richard D. Tabors	Tabors Caramanis Rudkevich	2019
F. Don Tan	E2 Systems	2025
Carson W. Taylor	Bonneville Power Administration	2005
John J. Taylor (died 2013)	Electric Power Research Institute	1974
Theofanis G. Theofanous	University of California, Santa Barbara	1998
James S. Thorp (died 2018)	Virginia Polytechnic Institute and State University	1996
Charles E. Till (died 2024)	Argonne National Laboratory	1989
John Avery Tillinghast (died 2011)	Independent Consultant	1974
William F. Tinney (died 2019)	Independent Consultant	1998
Neil E. Todreas	Massachusetts Institute of Technology	1988
Kevin L. Tomsovic	Clemson University	2023
Alvin W. Trivelpiece (died 2022)	Oak Ridge National Laboratory	1993
Paul Josef Turinsky	North Carolina State University	2017
Eric Avram Udren	Danovo Energy Solutions	2019
Stephen D. Umans	Independent Consultant	2009
John M. Undrill	John Undrill LLC	2011
James E. Van Ness (died 2016)	Northwestern University - Evanston	1998
Gordon van Welie	ISO New England	2017
Vickie A. VanZandt	VanZandt Electric Transmission Consulting, Inc.	2021
Gregory S. Vassell (died 2016)	Independent Consultant	1980
Evgeny P. Velikhov (died 2024)	Kurchatov Institute	2003
Georges Andre Charles Vendryes (died 2014)	Atomic Energy Commission of France	1978
John J. Vithayathil (died 2011)	Independent Consultant	2000
Vijay Vittal	Arizona State University	2004
Aubrey J. Wagner (died 1990)	Tennessee Valley Authority	1973
Charles L. Wagner (died 2014)	Independent Consultant	1999
Harvey A. Wagner (died 2005)	Detroit Edison Company	1970
Solveig Maria Ward	Quanta Technology, LLC	2022
Alvin M. Weinberg (died 2006)	Oak Ridge Associated Universities	1975
John M. West (died 2004)	Independent Consultant	1979
David C. White (died 2012)	Massachusetts Institute of Technology	1975
Willis S. White Jr. (died 2021)	American Electric Power Company, Inc.	1983
Eugene C. Whitney (died 1998)	Independent Consultant	1986
J. Ernest Wilkins Jr. (died 2011)	Clark Atlanta University	1976
Eugene P. Wilkinson (died 2013)	Institute of Nuclear Power Operations	1990
Gerald L. Wilson	Massachusetts Institute of Technology	1980
Bertram Wolfe (died 2004)	Independent Consultant	1980
Bruce F. Wollenberg	University of Minnesota, Minneapolis	2005
Dennis A. Woodford	The Electranix Corp.	2017
Herbert H. Woodson (died 2018)	The University of Texas at Austin	1975
Felix F. Wu	The University of Hong Kong	2026
Longya Xu	Florida State University	2023
Murty V. V. S. Yalla	Hubbell Incorporated	2021
Alden P. Yates (died 1989)	Bechtel Group, Inc.	1986
John Zaborszky (died 2008)	Washington University	1984
Adrian Zaccaria (died 2022)	Bechtel Group, Inc.	2007
Edwin L. Zebroski (died 2010)	Independent Consultant	1981
Xiaoxin Zhou	China Electric Power Research Institute	2021
