= John G. Kassakian =

American electrical engineer

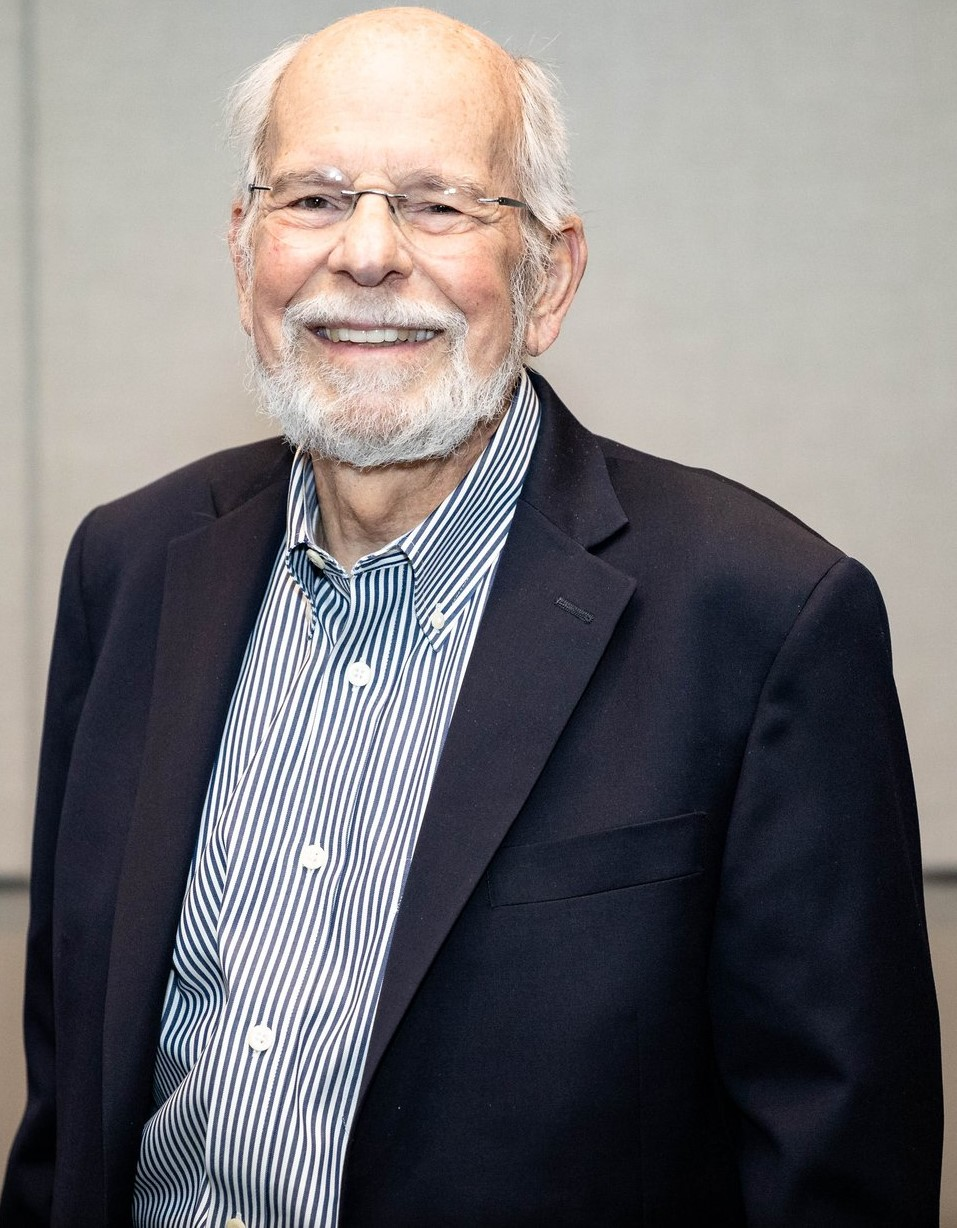
- Education: Massachusetts Institute of Technology
- Known for: Power Electronics (Electrical Engineering)
- Awards: European Power Electronics Association Achievement Award (2002), IEEE PELS Distinguished Service Award (1998), National Academy of Engineering (1994), IEEE Fellow (1989), IEEE PELS William E. Newell Power Electronics Award (1987)

John G. Kassakian is an American professor of electrical engineering ([Emeritus]) in the department of electrical engineering and computer science, Massachusetts Institute of Technology (MIT), US. Kassakian received his undergraduate and graduate degrees in Electrical and Electronics Engineering from MIT, culminating in a Doctor of Science (Sc.D.) in 1973. He is a Principal Investigator at the Research Laboratory of Electronics.

== IEEE Power Electronics Society ==
Within the professional community, Kassakian is best known for his leadership in the IEEE Power Electronics Society (PELS). He was a driving force in the formation of PELS in the 1980s, serving as the society's founding president from 1987 to 1988. As of 2024, the total PELS membership crossed 13,000 members globally. Before establishing PELS, Kassakian, along with his colleagues, felt the need for a power electronics conference serving industry, and, in 1986, created the Applied Power Electronics Conference (APEC). He was the General Chair of the 1st and 2nd APEC in 1986 and 1987. On the eve of the 40th anniversary of APEC, Kassakian was invited to give a presentation at the conference which he entitled "A Technology's Journey: 40 Years of APEC".

To honor him for all his efforts in initiating and supporting PELS, the society created the IEEE PELS John G. Kassakian Fellowship, which is awarded to promote, recognize, and support eligible students within the society's field of interest.

== Early life ==
Kassakian grew up in the small blue-collar town of Ridgefield Park, New Jersey, and attended its public schools. His early interest in electrical engineering was sparked by building a crystal radio and later enhanced by his love for and engagement with amateur radio. He first heard of MIT in his sophomore year in high school. During a mechanical drawing class, a friend mentioned that there was this school called MIT "where everyone who graduated got a job".

== Academic and research contributions ==
After serving a tour of duty in the United States Navy, Kassakian returned to MIT and completed his doctorate. He joined the MIT faculty of electrical engineering in 1973, where he started a research program in power electronics. He and two colleagues also started the first graduate power electronics course at MIT. He served as the director of the MIT Laboratory for Electromagnetic and Electronic Systems from 1991 to 2009.

Kassakian's early work in power electronics included analog methods for simulating power electronic circuits, characterization and application of semiconductor devices, and circuit designs including resonant power converters. He went on to study many further approaches to power conversion, including the use of extremely high switching frequencies and, with Prof. George Verghese of MIT - the use of sampled-data models in power electronics. Later in his career he explored advances in automotive applications of power electronics, including leading the MIT/industry Consortium on Advanced Automotive Electrical/Electronics Components and Systems, which established an SAE standard for 42-volt electrical systems in cars.

Kassakian co-authored the pioneering textbook "Principles of Power Electronics", in 1991 (2nd Edition published in 2023), helping to lay a solid foundation for continued growth and learning of the discipline. His book provides an understanding of how power is fundamentally processed using switch mode circuits and the tools and skills needed to understand how any power electronics circuit works. He has published more than 60 articles in IEEE journals with a cumulative citation of more than 2400. During his tenure at MIT, he supervised over 25 doctoral students, including David Perreault, MIT, and Khurram Afridi, Cornell University.

Kassakian has engaged in various industry and advisory roles. He was a member of the boards of directors of several companies and organizations, including Sheldahl, Inc., Ault, Inc., ISO New England (the independent system operator for New England's electric grid) and Marvell Technology Group, the later bringing his expertise to the semiconductor industry. He also served on the corporate advisory boards of Lutron Electronics and the Global Automotive Business Units of AMP, Inc. and Tyco Electronics.

Kasskaian was a co-chair and co-author of The Future of the Electric Grid, an interdisciplinary MIT study published in 2011 that examined the technological innovations and policy changes needed to upgrade the U.S. electric grid. He has also served on numerous US National Research Council (NRC) committees related to energy and transportation. These include committees on the deployment of electric vehicles, solid-state lighting, and U.S. Department of Energy research programs, where Kassakian helped evaluate and guide national research priorities. For many years he served on the NRC Standing Committee to review the US Research Program of the Partnership for a New Generation of Vehicles (PNGV).

== Awards and distinctions ==
Kassakian was one of the recipients of the IEEE Centennial Medal in 1984, an award to commemorate the centennial of IEEE's founding. In the year 1987, he received the PELS William E. Newell Power Electronics Award, which is presented to an individual with the scope "for outstanding contributions to power electronics." He was elevated to the grade of Fellow of IEEE in 1989 with the citation "for contributions to education and research in power electronics."

In 1994, Kassakian was elected into the US National Academy of Engineering, with the citation "for contribution to research, education, and industrial alliances in power electronics." In the same year, he was honored with the European Power Electronics Association Achievement Award. He was also awarded the IEEE PELS Distinguished Service Award in 1998 for contributing to the welfare of the PELS at an exceptional level of dedication and achievement.

The IEEE awarded Kassakian the IEEE Millennium Medal along with other awardees in 2000 as part of its celebration of the Third Millennium. In 2024, PELS decided to acknowledge the legacy of Kassakian and commemorate his contributions to IEEE and PELS with a Luminaries Special Session at the Energy Conversion Conference and Exposition (ECCE) 2024 in Phoenix, Arizona, US.
