= Harold K. Forsen =

American nuclear engineer

Harold K. Forsen (born September 19, 1932 in St. Joseph, Missouri) was an American nuclear physicist and member of the National Academy of Engineering, specializing in thermonuclear fusion and plasma physics. He was also an educator, industrial executive, and government advisor.

Forsen served in the Air Force from 1951 to 1955. After his tour of duty was finished, he enrolled in the California Institute of Technology and graduated with a B.S. and M.S. in Electrical Engineering in 1959. He obtained his PhD in 1965 from the Electrical Engineering Department at UC Berkeley under the mentorship of Professor Alvin Trivelpiece. In 1965 he was hired into the Nuclear Engineering Department of the University of Wisconsin-Madison. He became internationally known for his insight and academic work in the field of plasma physics. He helped to start Wisconsin's fusion technology program.

Before starting his PhD, he worked at the General Atomics Company in San Diego California in areas including nuclear fusion. Starting in 1973 he led a mostly classified program in the use of lasers to separate uranium-235 from uranium-238 for nuclear fission at the Exxon Nuclear Company. He eventually became an Executive Vice President in the company. At Exxon he created many patents utilizing laser isotope separation. While at Exxon, Harold continued his “academic” role and served as the President and finally Chairman of the Board of the Pacific Science Center for 6 years. He also was a founding member of the Washington State Academy of Sciences board of directors. He was hired at the Bechtel Company in San Francisco as the Vice President and Manager of the Technology Group in 1981.

He served on numerous advisory and review panels, including the 1990 DOE Fusion Policy Advisory Committee (FPAC), established by then Secretary of Energy James D. Watkins. Dr. Forsen received many professional awards, including the Arthur Holly Compton Award of the American Nuclear Society. He was a member of the American Academy of Arts and Sciences, a Fellow of the American Physical Society and the American Nuclear Society and was elected to the National Academy of Engineering in 1989. He was very active in the governance of the NAE, and after retirement served as the Foreign Secretary for 8 years (1995-2003). He was also elected as a foreign associate to the Japanese Engineering Academy.

Harold Forsen died on March 7, 2012, at the age of 79.

== Personal life ==
He married his high-school sweetheart Betty A. Webb in 1952.

After retiring in 1995, he lived in three different locations; Kirkland, Washington, North Lake Tahoe, California, and Indio, California.

He was survived by his wife of 60 years, Betty, and the rest of his family: John Forsen (Gayle), Ron Forsen (Debbie), Sandy Hartrick (Tom), six grandchildren, a sister-in-law and her children.

== See also ==
- List of members of the National Academy of Engineering (Electric power and energy systems)
