= Stephen O. Dean =

American physicist, engineer, and writer

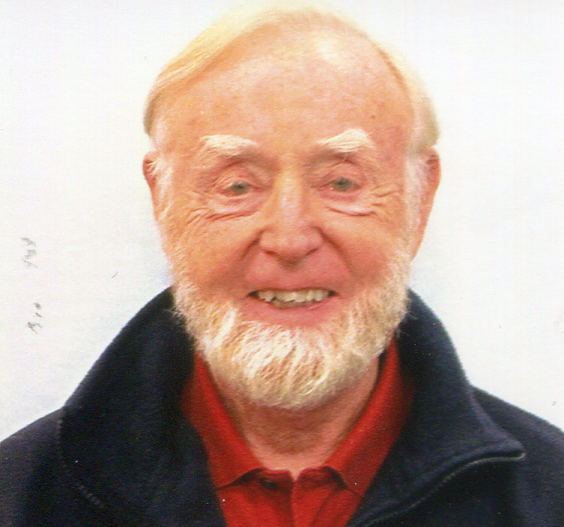
Stephen O. Dean

Stephen O. Dean (born May 12, 1936) is an American physicist, engineer and author. He was born in Niagara Falls, New York, United States, and grew up there through high school.

== Early life and education ==
Dean received his BS in physics from Boston College in 1960 and an SM in nuclear engineering from MIT in 1962. He completed his doctorate in physics from the University of Maryland (1971).

== Career ==
Dean has worked for over 50 years as a scientist and manager on the development of fusion for energy and other applications. After receiving his nuclear engineering degree from MIT in 1962, he joined the U.S. Atomic Energy Commission (AEC) as a staff physicist in the Controlled Thermonuclear Research (CTR) branch of the Research Division. The CTR branch was responsible for management of the U.S. fusion energy research program. In 1966, Dean co-authored the AEC's Policy and Action Paper on Controlled Thermonuclear Research which, after reviews by the AEC's General Advisory Committee, the Office of Management and Budget, and the President's Science Advisory Committee, was sent to the Congressional Joint Committee on Atomic Energy by the AEC.

In 1969, Dean transferred to the U.S. Naval Research Laboratory (NRL) as an experimental physicist where, over the next three years, he performed experiments on laser-produced plasmas, published three scientific papers and completed his PhD in physics at the University of Maryland. In February 1972, he received the Naval Research Laboratory Research Publication Award.

In early 1972, he returned to AEC and became an Assistant Director of the newly-formed CTR Division. In 1973, he chaired a review panel on the Status and Objectives of Tokamak Systems for Fusion Research. In 1975, the AEC became the US Energy Research and Development Administration (ERDA). He became the Director of the (magnetic) Confinement Systems Division, within the newly-established Office of Fusion Energy (OFE) where he led the preparation of the Fusion Power by Magnetic Confinement Program Plan. In 1977, ERDA became the US Department of Energy (DOE). In August 1979, Dean left government and co-founded (with Nicholas Krall and Alvin Trivelpiece) Fusion Power Associates, a non-profit scientific research and educational foundation and serves as the association's president.

In 1981, Dean edited the book Prospects for Fusion Power. In 1982, he contributed to the book Nuclear Power: Both Sides, edited by Michio Kaku and Jennifer Trainer. During 1985–1987, he co-led the DOE-commissioned Technical Planning Activity. For that work, in March 1988, he received a DOE Distinguished Associate Award from DOE Secretary of Energy John S. Herrington. In 1987 he was elected Fellow of the American Nuclear Society (ANS).

Dean served as a member of the DOE Fusion Energy Advisory Committee (FEAC) 1991–1994. In 1992, he led a FEAC study on Concept Improvement. In 1995, he served on the Secretary of Energy Advisory Board Task Force on Strategic Energy Research and Development. In 2002, he authored an article "Fifty Years of Fusion Research" in the American Nuclear Society magazine Nuclear News. In 2003, he served on a subpanel of the DOE Fusion Energy Sciences Advisory Committee (FESAC) to prepare a new fusion program plan. In 2011, he authored Chapter 31, "Historical Origins and Development of Fusion Research" in the Nuclear Energy Encyclopedia. In 2013, he published his book Search for the Ultimate Energy Source – A History of the U.S. Fusion Energy Program. In January 2017 he did an interview with journalist Miles O’Brien, a portion of which aired on the PBS NewsHour. In September 2017 he did a podcast interview for Episode 20 of the Energy-Cast series.

In 2018, he received the Albert Nelson Marquis Lifetime Achievement Award. Marquis Who's Who states that recipients are chosen on the basis of "noteworthy accomplishments, visibility, and prominence" in their chosen fields.

On April 3, 2024, he was an invited panelist for a one-hour press briefing sponsored by the United States Energy Association (USEA) moderated by veteran journalist Llewellyn King. The topic was "Fusion: Is Commercialization in Sight?" The briefing included reporters from The Wall Street Journal, The Washington Post, Public Broadcasting System and Forbes.

On May 1, 2025 he retired as President of Fusion Power Associates and was given the title President Emeritus.
