= IEEE Richard Harold Kaufmann Award =

Technical Field Award of the IEEE

- Awarded for: Outstanding contributions in industrial systems engineering
- Presented by: Institute of Electrical and Electronics Engineers
- First award: 1986
- Website: Richard Harold Kaufmann Award

The IEEE Richard Harold Kaufmann Award is a Technical Field Award of the IEEE that was established by the IEEE Board of Directors in 1986. This award is presented for outstanding contributions in industrial systems engineering.

The award may be presented to an individual, or team of up to three people.

Recipients of this award receive a bronze medal, certificate, and honorarium

== Recipients ==
- 1988: Walter C. Huening, Jr.
- 1989: Bernard W. Whittington
- 1990: Rene Castenschiold
- 1991: John R. Dunki-Jacobs
- 1992: Kao Chen
- 1993: George W. Walsh
- 1994: Daniel J. Love
- 1995: N. Shan Griffith
- 1996: Marcus O. Durham
- 1997: Thomas E. Sparling
- 1998: James A. Oliver
- 1999: Baldwin Bridger, Jr.
- 2000: Alton Dewitt Patton
- 2001: Louie J. Powell
- 2002: H. Landis Floyd, II
- 2003: Edward L. Owen
- 2004: Richard L. Nailen
- 2005: A. P. Meliopoulos
- 2006: George Younkin
- 2007: Md. Azizur Rahman
- 2008: Hirofumi Akagi, "For pioneering contributions to the theory of instantaneous reactive power in threephase circuits, and its applications to power conditioning"
- 2009: Ronald G. Harley, "For contributions to monitoring, control, and optimization of electrical processes, including electrical machines and power networks"
- 2010: Gerald T. Heydt, "For contributions to electric power quality, and transmission and distribution engineering"
- 2011: David Doyle Shipp, "For contributions to the design, analysis and protection of electrical power systems and personnel in industrial and commercial applications"
- 2012: John P. Nelson, "For leadership in grounding and protection design and the advancement of the electrical safety culture"
- 2013: Kaushik Rajashekara, "For contributions to the advancement of electrical systems in transportation for higher efficiency and lower emissions"
- 2014: Robert D. Lorenz, "For contributions to the development of methodologies and sensors for precision control of electric motor drives and coordinated drive systems"
- 2015: Charles John Mozina, "For contributions to the electrical protection of synchronous generators"
- 2016: G.S. Peter Castle, "For developments of applied electrostatic devices and processes in industry, agriculture, and environmental protection"
- 2017: Erling Hesla, "For leadership in establishing the fundamentals for the protection and safe operation of industrial power systems"
- 2018: Greg Charles Stone, "For advancements in rotating machines insulation evaluation and testing"
- 2019: Susumu Tadakuma (多田隈 進, Tadakuma Susumu), "For pioneering contributions to high power converters and drives for highspeed-train and industrial applications" His innovations were crucial for MAGLEV and Japanese bullet trains.
- 2020: Kouki Matsuse, "For pioneering contributions to the advancement of sensorless vector control of AC drives and multilevel inverters for industrial applications".
- 2021: Stephen McArthur, "For innovative contributions to the advancement of intelligent systems for power engineering applications."
- 2022: Paresh C. Sen, "For contributions to the theory, practice, education, and development of advanced industrial motor drives and power electronics systems."
- 2023: Edwald F Fuchs, "For contributions to power quality in power system operation, electric machines, renewable energy, and drives."
- 2024: Giuseppe Buja, "“For fundamental contributions to modulation and control of industrial drives."
- 2025: Vladimir Blasko, "For contributions to the theory and applications of bidirectional power converters in high-performance motor drive systems."
- 2026: Noriko Kawakami
- 2027: Akshay Kumar Rathore
