= IEEE William E. Newell Power Electronics Award =

Technical award

- Awarded for: Outstanding contribution(s) to the advancement of power electronics
- Presented by: Institute of Electrical and Electronics Engineers
- First award: 2005
- Website: IEEE William E. Newell Power Electronics Award

The IEEE William E. Newell Power Electronics Award is a Technical Field Award of the IEEE that was established by the IEEE Board of Directors in 2005. This award is presented annually for outstanding contribution(s) to the advancement of power electronics. The award is named in honor of William E. Newell.

This award may be presented to an individual only.

Recipients of this award receive a bronze medal, certificate, and honorarium.

== Recipients ==
The following people received the IEEE William E. Newell Power Electronics Award:

- 2027: Paolo Mattavelli
- 2026: José Rodríguez
- 2025: Atsuo Kawamura
- 2024: David J. Perreault
- 2023: Dragan Maksimovic
- 2022: Fang Zheng Peng
- 2021: Robert W. Erickson
- 2020: Ivo Barbi
- 2019: Patrizio Vinciarelli
- 2018: Rainer Marquardt
- 2017: Seung-Ki Sul
- 2016: Johann W. Kolar
- 2015: Shu Yuen Ron Hui
- 2014: Frede Blaabjerg
- 2013: Rik W. De Doncker
- 2012: Leo Lorenz
- 2011: Praveen Jain
- 2010: Akio Nakagawa
- 2009: Tadashi Fukao
- 2008: Istvan Nagy
- 2007: Dushan Boroyevich
- 2006: Deepakraj M. Divan

The following people received the William E. Newell Award from the IEEE Power Electronics Society:

- 2005: Bimal K. Bose* 2000: Luigi F. Malesani
- 2004: M. Azizur Rahman
- 2003: Philip T. Krein
- 2002: Emanuel E. Landsman
- 2001: Hirofumi Akagi
- 2000: Luigi F. Malesani
