= David John Perreault =

American professor of electrical engineering

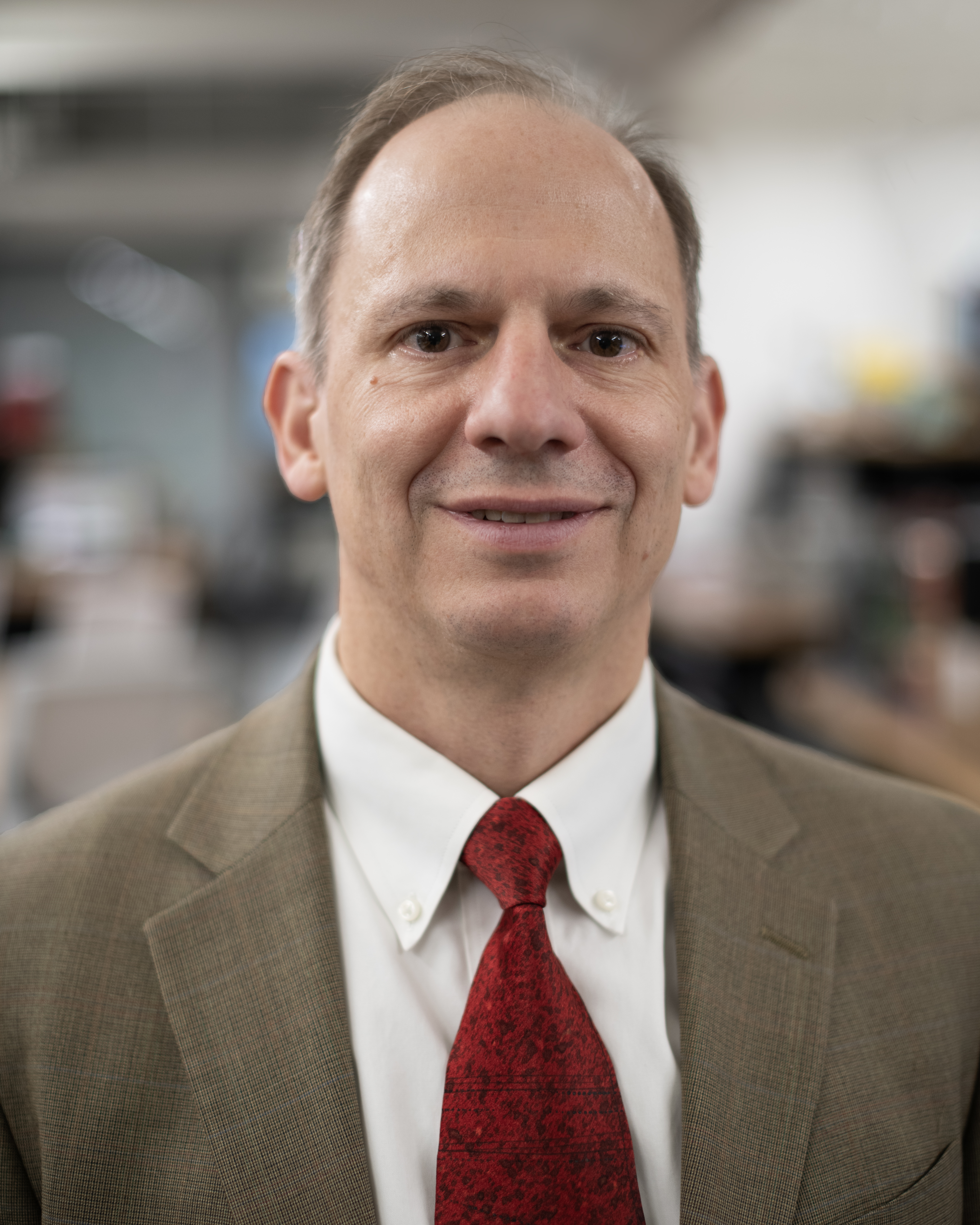
- Education: Massachusetts Institute of Technology
- Known for: Power Electronics (Electrical Engineering)
- Awards: IEEE William E. Newell Power Electronics Award (2024), R. David Middlebrook Achievement Award (2015), IEEE Fellow (2013)

David John Perreault is the Ford Foundation Professor of Engineering (EE) in the department of Electrical Engineering and Computer Science (EECS) at the Massachusetts Institute of Technology (MIT). He is a Principal Investigator at the Research Laboratory of Electronics. His research interests include design, manufacturing, and control techniques for power electronic systems and components and their use in a wide range of applications.

== Education background ==
David Perreault received the B.S. degree from Boston University in 1989. He received the S.M. and Ph.D. degrees from the MIT in 1991 and 1997, respectively.

== Research contribution ==
Perreault's research at MIT has addressed the twin challenges of miniaturization and performance of power electronics. His work in power electronics has allowed operating power converters at frequencies beyond 100 MHz to enable small-scale devices and improve integration. He has experience in very-high-frequency power conversion that has helped in developing higher-efficiency approaches for radio frequency power amplifiers. Continuing on his work, he is working on high-power density power converters using piezoelectric resonators as passive components.

Perreault co-founded Eta Devices, Inc. (acquired by Nokia in 2016) and Eta Wireless, Inc. (acquired by Murata Manufacturing in 2021), startup companies focusing on power management for high-efficiency radio frequency power amplifiers. While Eta Devices helped Nokia's push for enhanced base station energy efficiency, Eta Wireless helped Murata Manufacturing with power saving technology for smartphones.

According to the IEEE Xplore. Perrault has more than 250 publications and over 7,800 citations based on his research work. He has co-authored a book entitled "Principles of Power Electronics" (2nd edition) in 2023 to cover foundational concepts in circuits, magnetics, devices, dynamic models, and control. He also owns more than 70 patents to his credit.

== Awards and distinctions ==
In 2001, Perreault was awarded the Richard M. Bass Outstanding Young Power Electronics Engineer Award. The award is meant to recognize the achievement in the power electronics field by an engineer under 35 years of age. He was elevated to IEEE Fellow in 2013 under the category "Research Engineer/Scientist" with the citation for the award mentioning "for contributions to design and application of very high frequency power electronic converters".

In 2015, Perreault was awarded the IEEE PELS R. David Middlebrook Achievement Award to recognize his accomplishments in the technical field of power electronics within one or more subfields. He was later elected into the National Academy of Engineering in the year 2021 with the citation mentioning "for contributions to power electronics technology and design techniques for very high frequency energy conversion". After three years in 2024, Perreault received the IEEE William E. Newell Power Electronics Award with the citation mentioning "for contributions to the development of very-high-frequency power converters". The scope of the award is for outstanding contributions to power electronics and conferred directly by the IEEE.
