= Susumu Tadakuma =

Japanese electrical engineer

Susumu Tadakuma (多田隈 進, Tadakuma Susumu) is a Japanese electrical engineer and professor emeritus with Chiba Institute of Technology, Chiba, Japan, lifetime IEEE Fellow.

He is the recipient of the 2019 IEEE Richard Harold Kaufmann Award "for pioneering contributions to high-power converters and drives for highspeed-train and industrial applications"

Among other achievements, his innovations in motor controllers were crucial for MAGLEV and Japanese bullet trains.
