= Inverter compressor =

Air conditioning technology

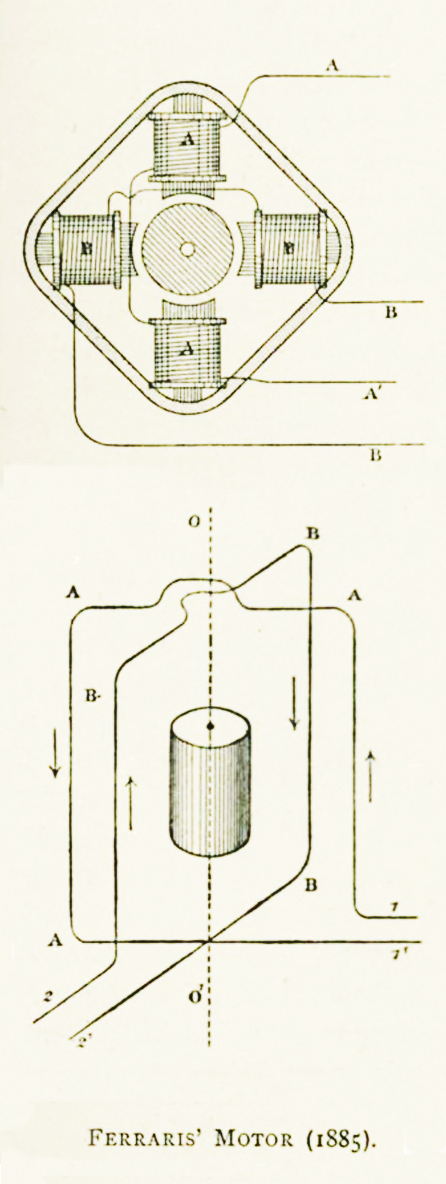
AC two phases motor invented by Italian physicist Galileo Ferraris. In an inverter-driven motor, the multiple phases are generated by an electronic circuit. The rotor is a permanent-magnet

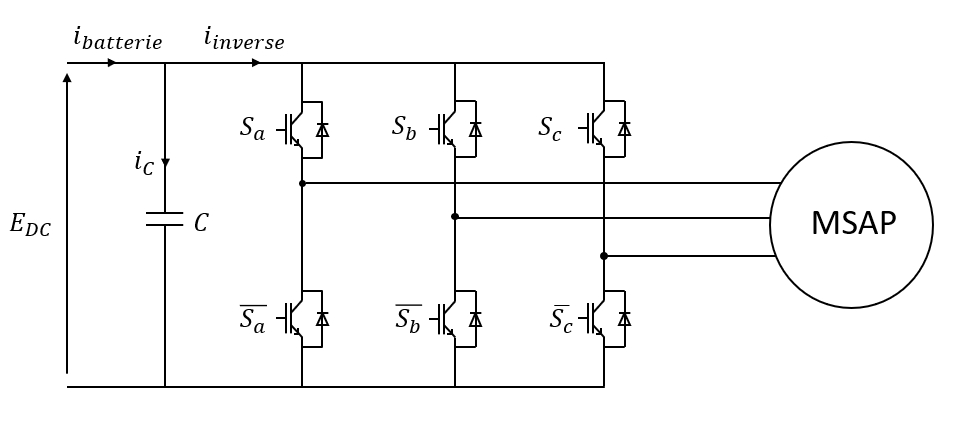
Electrical schematic of a three-phase inverter. It shows the 6 switches and their control circuitry. The three switching cells drive the three-phase permanent-magnet synchronous motor of the compressor. The inverter is out side of the compressor

An inverter compressor in air conditioner or refrigerator is a compressor driven by a polyphase permanent-magnet synchronous motor, where the phases (two or three) are generated by an electronic circuit commonly referred to as an inverter. Older compressors and fans are driven by split-phase induction motors, where a phase shift is created using a few microfarads capacitor.

In the hermetic type, it can either be a scroll or reciprocating compressor. This type of compressor uses a drive to control the compressor motor speed to modulate cooling capacity. Capacity modulation is a way to match cooling capacity to cooling demand to application requirements.

The first inverter air conditioners were released in 1980–1981.

== Inverter compressor types ==
In refrigerators, there are generally two main types of inverter compressors: the standard inverter compressor and the linear inverter compressor.

=== Smart inverter compressor ===
The smart inverter compressor utilizes a "V" inverter system, which stands for variable voltage and frequency. This system operates on a three-phase control algorithm, allowing the compressor to adjust its performance dynamically according to cooling demands. The smart inverter design helps optimize energy consumption and enhances overall cooling efficiency.

=== Inverter linear compressor ===
The inverter linear compressor category includes two distinct systems:

- E-inverter system: Operates at a constant voltage and frequency. The compressor runs at a fixed speed in a single-phase configuration, using a simple on/off mechanism to maintain a steady cooling output.
- A-inverter system: Utilizes variable voltage and frequency within a single-phase setup. It employs a control algorithm to adjust compressor performance according to temperature and load conditions, ensuring efficient cooling and adaptability to varying requirements.

== Market needs for variable capacity ==
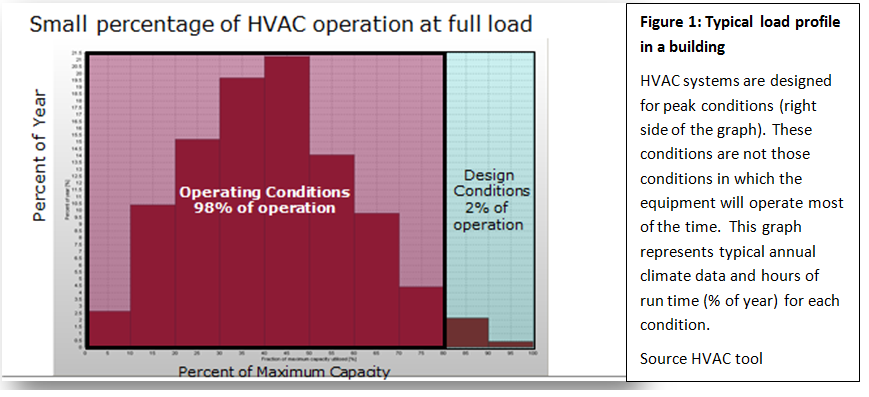
Typical load profile in a building

Many refrigeration and air conditioning systems require reliable processes; The cooling requirements vary over a wide range during the day and over the year due to ambient conditions, occupancy and use, lighting, etc.

- In comfort cooling, there may also be the need for a stable and accurate temperature and humidity control in areas such as hospitals, IT & telecoms, process cooling. In applications such as schools, restaurants and office buildings, it is important that the cooling system is able to adapt to wide daily shifts in load.
- In process applications such as fermentation, growing tunnels and industrial processes, accurate temperature settings are required to secure production quality.

== Working principle ==
A variable-frequency drive controls the speed of the compressor motor. The compressor is specifically designed to run at different motor speeds to modulate cooling output. Variable speed operation requires an appropriate compressor lubrication system. Proper oil management is a critical requirement to ensure compressor reliability. The oil management system provides proper lubrication for the Scroll compressor at low speed and prevents excess oil from being injected into the circuit when operating at full speed.

== Applications ==
Variable speed technology can be implemented in HVAC, close control and process cooling applications and as diverse as packaged or split air-conditioning units, rooftops, chillers, precision cooling, VRF and condensing units.

Rooftop
This is a very common unit type. The rising cost of energy means that air conditioning manufacturers must develop a new generation of high-efficiency, cost-effective air conditioners for commercial buildings that meet or exceed a part-load efficiency standard of typically 18 IEER. The aim is to reduce energy use by 30% over current equipment. Inverter technology helps OEMs to build units which meet this demand.
Air handling units
These have integrated cooling and are used in commercial applications for air conditioning and humidity control in diverse ranges of buildings such as small office buildings, fitness and medical centres. Inverter compressor solutions enable smooth modulation and huge energy savings.
Modular chillers
A typical modular chiller installation uses multiple fixed-speed. These units share the same water system to supply the building with cooled or heated water. Hybrid tandem, associating one inverter and one fixed-speed compressor, can better match the capacity requirement compared to a modular chiller with fixed-speed tandem compressors and increases efficiency.
Solar-powered air conditioning
Inverter compressors make solar-powered air conditioning viable. Before, fixed-speed on/off compressors required an inrush, or surge, current that was 4 to 6 times greater than the running current at startup, meaning a requirement of 4 to 6 times more solar panels or batteries. Inverter compressors start slowly and avoid this startup power which is needed each time a standard on/off compressor comes on.
Close control units
These are used in the cooling of IT and electronic equipment used in data centres, telecommunications and in manufacturing industries. Power management, energy consumption and heat loads are major challenges. Maintenance of a stable temperature and humidity control, compactness of the system and overall efficiency are key design challenges in these applications for ensuring data safety and availability. This is where inverter technology makes the difference.
Process cooling
In many industries the machinery and processes generate a large amount of heat which requires cooling, to protect the equipment and / or to ensure that the product being manufactured is of the required quality. Inverter technology helps to secure the process while providing greater efficiency.
Variable refrigerant flow (VRF)
VRF units are very popular cooling or reversible systems (heating and cooling). They combine the flexibility for building owners and occupants alike, with energy efficiency, high comfort, and ease of installation, without compromising on reliability. VRF systems already extensively use inverter technology.

== Challenges in adopting inverter scroll in HVAC systems ==
The compressor and drive need to be qualified to work together and for dedicated applications. The drive modulates the compressor speed and prevents it from operating out of the compressor operating limits. The inverter frequency drives need to use algorithms developed specifically for heating, ventilation and air conditioning (HVAC) or for refrigeration. They ensure that the system will run within the application constraints. The drive can also manage other devices such as oil injection valves or multiple compressors. As the compressor rotational speed changes, the amount of refrigerant — and oil — flowing through the compressor increases or decreases. The drive ensures that the compressor and bearings are optimally lubricated at all operating conditions by running the compressor in a suitable speed regime.

== See also ==
- Variable refrigerant flow
