= Noriko Kawakami =

Japanese electrical engineer

Noriko Kawakami (Japanese: 川上 紀子) is a Japanese electrical engineer whose work involves high-voltage direct current storage, transmission, and conversion, including power conversion for wind turbines. She works in the Power Electronics Systems Division of TMEIC, a joint venture of Toshiba and Mitsubishi Electric, as a senior fellow.

== Education and career ==
Kawakami studied physics at Sophia University, graduating in 1982, and in the same year joined Toshiba. She moved to TMEIC in 2003, and earned a Ph.D. in electrical engineering in 2008 through the Tokyo Institute of Technology. She became president of the Industry Applications Society of the Institute of Electrical Engineers of Japan (IEEJ) from 2018 to 2020.

== Recognitions ==
The IEEJ gave Kawakami their Technical Development Award in 2000 and their Transactions Prize in 2010.

She was elected as an IEEE Fellow, in the 2018 class of fellows, "for contributions to large-capacity power converters and applications". She was the 2022 honoree of the IEEE McMurray Award for Industry Achievements in Power Electronics, "for contributions to large-capacity power converters and their applications to industry and utility".

She received the 2026 IEEE Richard Harold Kaufmann Award, "for contributions to high-power grid-tied power conversion systems in high reliability industrial and utility applications".
