= Paolo Mattavelli =

Paolo Mattavelli is a professor at the University of Padua, Italy, specializing in power electronics.

== Education and career ==
Mattavelli got his Master's in electrical engineering with honors from the University of Padua in 1992. He continued his education as European Space Agency Fellow, obtaining Ph.D. in the same field, from the same university, in 1996. Mattavelli was a visiting researcher with the Massachusetts Institute of Technology and Myongji University in 1995 and 1999, respectively. From 1995 to 2001, Mattavelli was a researcher at the University of Padua and from 2001 to 2005 held the same position at the University of Udine. During that time, he also was a researcher at Northeastern University and a year later, was promoted to an Associate Professor of Electronics at Udine University. When he returned to Padua University in 2005, Mattavelli continued serving as associate professor at the university's Department of Technology and Management of Industrial Systems. From 2010 to 2012 Mattavelli was with the Center for Power Electronics Systems at Virginia Tech.

Since 2003, he serves as an associate editor of the IEEE Transactions on Power Electronics and is the IPCC Paper Review Chair for IEEE Transactions on Industry Applications. A year later, Mattavelli was promoted to the Technical Review Chairman for the IEEE Transactions on Industry Applications, remaining as such until 2010.

== Awards and recognitions ==
- Fellow of the IEEE (2015) for contributions to power converters for grid-connected applications and power management
- IEEE William E. Newell Power Electronics Award (2027), for contributions to advanced modeling and control of power electronics converters
