= Fang Zheng Peng =

21st century American academic

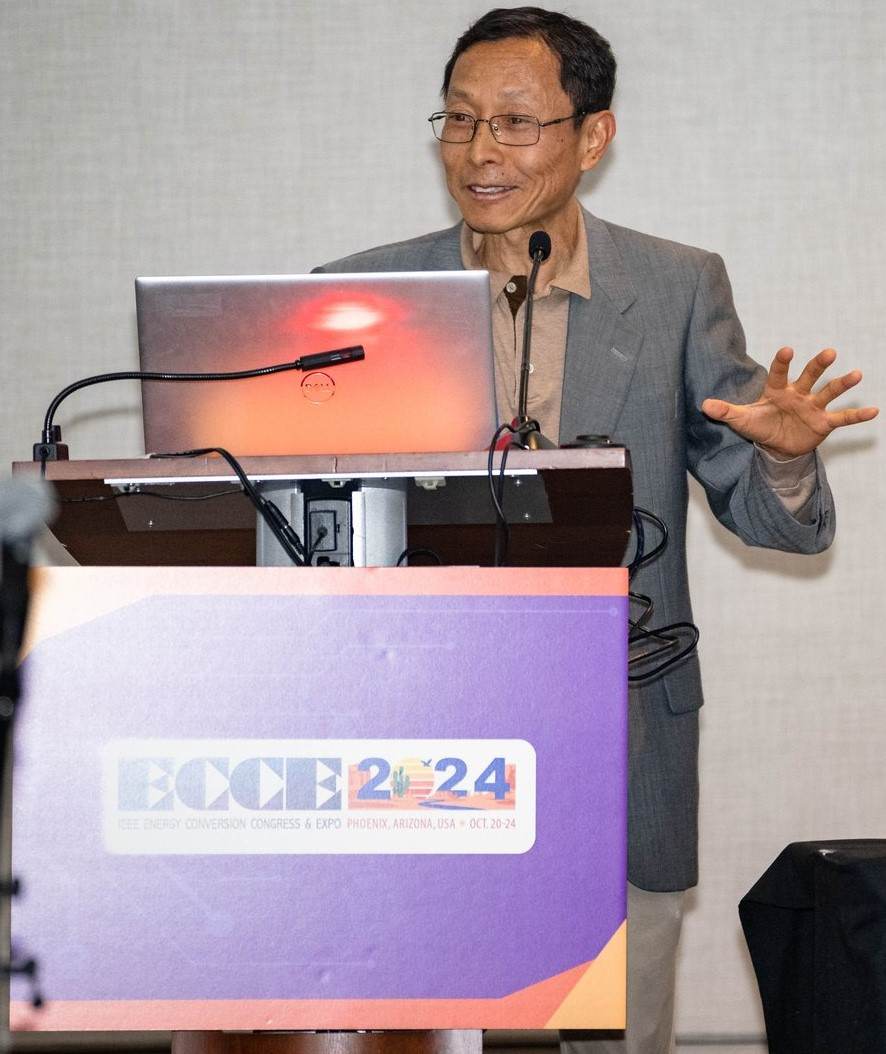
- Education: Nagaoka University of Technology
- Known for: Power Electronics (Electrical Engineering)
- Awards: IEEE Medal in Power Engineering (2026), IEEE William E. Newell Power Electronics Award (2022), Fellow of the National Academy of Inventors (2022), IEEE Fellow (2005)

Fang Zheng Peng is the Director, Energy GRID Institute and a RK Mellon Endowed Chair Professor of Electrical and Computer Engineering in the University of Pittsburgh, U.S. Earlier, he was a Distinguished Professor of Engineering at the Center for Advanced Power Systems, Florida State University, and a distinguished professor at Michigan State University. His primary research area is power electronics, covering the development of Z-source inverters and multilevel inverters for STATCOM applications to improve power flow capability.

== Education background ==
Peng received the B.S. degree in electrical engineering from Wuhan University, China, in 1983 and the M.S. and Ph.D. degrees both in electrical engineering from the Nagaoka University of Technology, Japan, in 1987 and 1990, respectively.

== Research contributions ==
Peng is credited with developing the digital Z-source converter, which can protect the power system in a short period of time of 5 microseconds. The significance of the research lies in the fact that the switching speed is 1000 times faster than a conventional circuit breaker. Conventional circuit breakers take around 50 milliseconds to activate in case of safety mechanism during an electrical fault. The time taken is long enough to kill a person or spark a fire. Therefore, Peng's research helps in reducing the voltage to a safe range in quick time to prevent fires. The research is particularly useful in the wake of hundreds of wildfires every year in the United States.

Peng's earlier innovations with cascaded multilevel inverters to flexible ac transmission system during the 1990s allowed for transformerless operations to reach utility-scale voltage levels and power ratings. The innovation has been incorporated worldwide and helped in avoiding costs, power loss, bulkiness, and failure issues encountered with traditional multiphase inverters.

Peng has more than 400 publications in IEEE Xplore and citations of more than 17,800. His publications covered a wide variety of power electronics and power system topics, including modular multilevel converter, phase-locked loop, current control, sensorless control, wide bandgap devices, and digital signal processing to name a few.

== Awards and distinctions ==
Peng was elevated to the Fellow of IEEE in 2005 under the "Research Engineer/Scientist" category, with the citation mentioning "for contributions to multilevel power converter topology, control, and applications". In 2013, he was awarded the IAS Gerald Kliman Award by the IEEE Industry Applications Society for advancement of power conversion technologies through innovations and their application to industry. He is also the recipient of the IAS Outstanding Achievement Award in the year 2020 for contribution in the application of electricity to industry in accordance with the scope of the IEEE Industry Applications Society.

In 2022, Peng was awarded the IEEE William E. Newell Power Electronics Award with the citation mentioning "for the development of cascaded multilevel inverters and high-power converter topologies, and for their advancement in grid-scale applications." In the same year, he was officially inducted as a Fellow of the National Academy of Inventors for demonstrating innovation in creating or facilitating inventions that have made a tangible impact on quality of life, economic development, and the welfare of the society.

In 2025 he was elected to the National Academy of Engineering "for contributions to the development of high-power electronics technologies for advanced power grid control and energy conversion."

In 2026 he received the IEEE Medal in Power Engineering.
