= Nicholas Krall =

American physicist (1932–2026)

Nicholas Anthony Krall (February 16, 1932 – January 17, 2026) was an American theoretical plasma physicist. He authored over 160 science publications and contributed to the fields of electron scattering, plasma stability, high energy nuclear physics and magnetohydrodynamics. Krall worked at General Atomics, the University of California, San Diego, the Naval Research Laboratory and University of Maryland.

== Life and career ==
Krall was born in Kansas City on February 16, 1932. He is the son of Catherine Krall, and her husband Nicholas J. Krall. He received his BS in physics from the University of Notre Dame in 1954 and his PhD in theoretical physics from Cornell University in 1959. After graduation, Dr. Krall worked as a staff scientist and a manager at General Atomics in San Diego until 1967. He worked closely with physicist Marshall Rosenbluth. After general atomics he accepted a position as professor of physics at the University of Maryland, College Park in 1967 and held that position for six years. While at Maryland he was appointed director joint program for plasma physics, at the Naval Research Laboratory. He held that position until 1973. He also co-wrote a textbook on plasma physics with Alvin Trivelpiece and in 1973 he won a Guggenheim Fellowship. He was a visiting professor at the University of California, San Diego and became a vice president at Science Applications, Inc. until 1978. He made contributions to the plasma behavior in Tokamaks and Stellarators. He was appointed chairman of the US Department of Energy's Office of Science committee on alternate fusion concepts in 1977. He became executive vice president and chief scientist at Jaycor Inc in 1978 and held that position until at least 1985. He co-founded (with Stephen O. Dean and Alvin Trivelpiece) the Fusion Power Associates, a Washington-based non for profit organization in 1979 and served as board chairman in 1983. In 1980 he served as chairman of division of plasma physics for the American Physical Society. In January 1988, he formed a consulting firm, Krall Associates. He consulted with Robert W. Bussard in the late 1980s and early 1990s on Polywell research.

He was twice married and was the father of six children and grandfather of nine. In retirement he continued contributing to research within his field.

Krall died on January 17, 2026, at the age of 93.
