= Little Box Challenge =

The Little Box Challenge was an engineering competition run by Google and the IEEE's Power Electronics Society. The original challenge was posted on July 22, 2014, with modifications on December 16, 2014, and March 23, 2015. Testing was in October 2015 at the National Renewable Energy Laboratory. From the 18 finalists, CE+T Power's team called Red Electrical Devils won the $1 million prize, which was awarded to them in March 2016.

The challenge was to build a power inverter that was about one tenth the size of the state-of-the-art at the time. It had to have an efficiency greater than 95 percent and handle loads of 2 kW. It also had to fit in a metal enclosure of no more than 40 cubic inches (the eponymous "little box") and withstand 100 hours of testing.

The goals of the competition were lower cost solar photovoltaic power, more efficient uninterruptible power supplies, affordable microgrids, and the ability to use an electric vehicle's battery as backup power during a power outage. Google also hoped a smaller inverter could make its data centers run more efficiently.

More than 100 international teams from university researchers and students to large companies and garage tinkerers entered the Google Little Box Challenge competition. Eighteen finalists were chosen in October 2015. These 18 teams entered the Challenge's final stretch by submitting their competition prototypes, which underwent Google's stringent test regimen. The results of this worldwide competition were announced at the ARPA-E 2016, March conference. Of the 18 finalists, only 3 teams passed every one of Google's test requirements, those being the top three finishers.

== First Place Finisher - The Red Electrical Devils ==
=== (CE+T Power, Belgium) ===
Olivier Bomboir, Paul Bleus, Fabrice Frebel, Thierry Joannès, François Milstein, Pierre Stassain, Christophe Geuzaine, Carl Emmerechts, Philippe Laurent

== Second Place Finisher - Schneider Electric Team ==
=== (France) ===
Miao-xin Wang, Rajesh Ghosh, Srikanth Mudiyula, Radoslava Mitova, David Reilly, Milind Dighrasker, Sajeesh Sulaiman, Alain Dentella, Damir Klikic, Chandrashekar Devalapuraramegowda, Michael Hartmann, Vijaykumar Atadkar

== Third Place Finisher - Future Energy Electronics Center ==
=== (Virginia Tech, USA) ===
Jih-Sheng Lai, Lanhua Zhang, Xiaonan Zhao, Rachael Born, Chung-Yi Lin, Ming-Chang Chou, Shu-Shuo Chang, Kye Yak See

== Remaining finalists ==
=== !verter ===
==== (Germany/Switzerland/Slovenia) ====
Eckart Hoene, Johann W. Kolar, Dominik Bortis, Yanick Lobsiger, Dominik Neumayr, Oliver Knecht, Florian Krismer, Stefan Hoffmann, Adam Kuczmik, Oleg Zeiter, Franc Zajc

=== Adiabatic Logic ===
==== (UK) ====
Geoff Harvey, Alan Willybridge, Steve Love

=== AHED ===
==== (Germany) ====
Alexander Huenten

=== AMR ===
==== (Argentina) ====
Agustin Reibel

=== Cambridge Active Magnetics ===
==== (UK) ====
John Wood, Ed Shelton, Tim Regan, Ellen Wood, Kyle Rogers, Dr Kevin Rathbone, Sam Harrup

=== Energylayer ===
==== (Ukraine) ====
Evgeny Sboychakov, Ruslan Kotelnikov

=== Fraunhofer IISB ===
==== (Germany) ====
Bernd Eckardt, Stefan Endres, Maximilian Hofmann, Stefan Matlok, Thomas Menrath, Martin März, Stefan Zeltner

=== Helios ===
==== (USA) ====
Jack Zhu, Mari Ma

=== LBC1 ===
==== (Slovakia) ====
Martin Pietka, Andrej Teren, Marian Vranka, Lubos Drozd, Peter Sedlacko

=== OKE-Services ===
==== (Netherlands) ====
Henk Oldenkamp

=== Rompower ===
==== (USA/Romania) ====
Ionel Jitaru, Nicolae Daniel Bolohan, Antonio Marco Davila

=== The University of Tennessee ===
==== (USA) ====
Daniel Costinett, Leon Tolbert, Fred Wang, Chongwen Zhao, Bradford Trento, Ling Jiang, Rick Langley, John Jansen, Reid Kress, Anthony Brun

=== 3NERGY (Tommasi - Bailly) ===
==== (France) ====
Mike Tommasi, Alain Bailly

=== UIUC Pilawa Group ===
==== (USA) ====
Robert Pilawa, Shibin Qin, Christopher Barth, Yutian Lei, Wen-Chuen Liu, Andrew Stillwell, Intae Moon, Derek Chou, Thomas Foulkes

=== Venderbosch ===
==== (Netherlands) ====
Herbert Venderbosch, Gerard Bruggink

== See also ==
- Solar micro-inverter
