= William E. Newell =

Dr. William E. Newell (died 1976) was an author and "noted authority on power electronics". He worked at the Westinghouse Research and Development Center in Pittsburgh.

== Influence ==
The William E. Newell Power Electronics Award was created in 1977 by the Power Electronics Society, and in 2005, the IEEE established another award in his name, this one called the IEEE William E. Newell Power Electronics Award.

== Works ==
- Motto, Jr., John William, (editor), Introduction to Solid State Power Electronics, Westinghouse Electric Corporation, Semiconductor Division, Youngwood, PA 15697, 1977. 143 p. edited from the posthumous notes of William E. Newell
