= Gerald T. Heydt =

American professor of electrical engineering

Gerald Thomas Heydt is an American electrical engineer and Regents’ Professor at Arizona State University, Tempe.

Heydt was elected a member of the National Academy of Engineering in 1997 for contributions to the technology of electric power quality.

== Honors ==
- The 2010 recipient of the IEEE Richard Harold Kaufmann Award for his pioneering work in power quality analysis techniques, notably the "harmonic power flow" method (1981) commercialized as HARMFLO software and the analytical foundations for the CBEMA power curve method for analyzing three-phase unbalanced situations.
- Electric Power Engineering Research and Education, a festschrift for Gerald T. Heydt, ISBN 978-3-319-17189-0
- IEEE Life Fellow
