= Bruce Behruz Fardanesh =

American electrical engineer

Bruce Behruz Fardanesh from the New York Power Authority (NYPA) in White Plains, New York was named Fellow of the Institute of Electrical and Electronics Engineers (IEEE) in 2013 for contributions to phasor measurement technology and flexible AC transmission systems.
