= Eugene Litvinov =

Eugene Litvinov (July 1, 1950 – September 25, 2020) was Chief Technologist of ISO New England Inc, in Holyoke, MA. He was named Fellow of the Institute of Electrical and Electronics Engineers (IEEE) in 2013 for leadership in market design and power system control. He was elected to the 2020 class of National Academy of Engineering (NAE) for development of optimization mathematics for new electricity markets and innovative applications for electric grid control, visualization, and planning.
