= Cordell Reed =

African American mechanical engineer

Cordell Reed was an African American mechanical engineer and energy executive at Commonwealth Edison in Chicago, Illinois.

== Early life and education ==
A native of Chicago, Illinois, Cordell Reed was born on March 26, 1938. His parents were Carrie Bell and Clevon Reed. Reed was raised in a South Side Chicago public housing area known as the Ida B. Wells Homes. Reed went to Tilden Technical High School. He attended the University of Illinois, Urbana-Champaign, and graduated in 1960. Reed was the third African American to earn a Bachelor of Science degree in mechanical engineering from the university. He went on to earn his Master’s degree in mechanical engineering at the same university.

== Career ==
Reed secured a job at Commonwealth Edison (ComEd) Company of Chicago after graduation in 1960. He held many positions there, eventually becoming vice president of nuclear operations. In his first position, Reed was an engineer working with coal-fire generating stations. He moved to the nuclear division in 1967. In 1975 he gained the executive role of public spokesman for nuclear power. In another role as appointed manager of the nuclear engineering department, Reed led 75 engineers in designing all nuclear projects. Some of Reed’s other career highlights include chief nuclear officer in 1979, a promotion to senior vice president in 1987, and positions as chief diversity officer and ethics officer in 1994. Reed was instrumental in addressing the Three Mile Island accident in 1979. He collaborated to create federal safeguards for public safety. He participated in a trade mission to South Africa in 1995.

== Achievements ==
Reed’s accolades and achievements included receiving a 1988 Lifetime Achievement Award from the Black Engineer of the Year Awards and being inducted into the National Academy of Engineering in 1992. He was one of eight black engineers to have received this honor as of 1999. In 1993, he received the American Nuclear Society’s Tommy Thompson Award. Chicago State University named The Cordell Reed Student Union after him in 2001, four years after his 1997 retirement from Commonwealth Edison.
