= Vera Silva =

Portuguese engineer

- Born: Vera Lucia Fernandes de Paiva da Silva
- Education: University of Porto (BSc and MSc); Imperial College London (PhD)
- Scientific career
- Fields: Variable generation Power systems economics Electric vehicles Demand side management Optimisation
- Workplaces: General Electric; EDF; Polytechnic Institute of Porto
- Thesis: Value of flexibility in systems with large wind penetration (2010)
- Doctoral advisor: Goran Strbac

Vera Silva is a Portuguese engineer and the chief strategy and technology officer (CSO/CTO) at the GE Vernova electrical grid Electrification Systems division. She is one of the few women to hold a chief technology officer position in the electricity transmission and distribution space. She works on electricity grids technology and renewable energy integration.

== Early life and education ==
As a child Silva visited a large hydro power plant which sparked her interest in electricity systems. Silva studied electrical engineering and computer science at the University of Porto. She earned a bachelor's degree in 1999 and a master's degree in 2003 both in electrical engineering. She moved to the United Kingdom for her doctoral studies, earning a PhD in the electrical and electronics engineering in 2010. Her PhD investigated the value of flexibility in systems that use wind power and was supervised by Goran Strbac.

== Research and career ==
She worked as a lecturer and data scientist at the Polytechnic Institute of Porto. After completing her doctorate, Silva joined EDF R&D in France, where she directed their program on Energy Systems and Markets. As of 2019 Silva was the chief technology officer (CTO) at General Electric grid solutions, where she led 3,400 engineers around the world and worked on new electricity grid technology. She was one of the few women to be made CTO at General Electric. She believes the future will involve more sustainable and flexible technologies, integrating microgrids and high voltage direct current (DC) transmission lines. She is pushing for utilities operators to find it easier to integrate renewables into homes.
