= Z-source inverter =

Type of power inverter

A Z-source inverter is a type of power inverter, a circuit that converts direct current to alternating current. The circuit functions as a buck-boost inverter without making use of DC-DC converter bridge due to its topology.

Impedance (Z) source networks efficiently convert power between source and load from DC to DC, DC to AC, and from AC to AC.

The numbers of modifications and new Z-source topologies have grown rapidly since 2002. Improvements to the impedance networks by introducing coupled magnetics have also been lately proposed for achieving even higher voltage boosting, while using a shorter shoot-through time. They include the Γ-source, T-source, trans-Z-source, TZ-source, LCCT-Z-source that utilizes a high-frequency transformer connected in series with two DC-current-blocking capacitors, high-frequency transformer-isolated, and Y-source networks. Amongst them, the Y-source network is more versatile and can be viewed as the generic network, from which the Γ-source, T-source, and trans-Z-source networks are derived. The incommensurate properties of this network open a new horizon to researchers and engineers to explore, expand, and modify the circuit for a wide range of power conversion applications.

== Types of inverters ==
Inverters can be classified by their structure as

- Single-phase inverter: This type of inverter consists of two legs or two poles. (A pole is connection of two switches where source of one and drain of other are connected and this common point is taken out).
- Three-phase inverter: This type of inverter consists of three legs or poles or four legs (three legs for phases and one for neutral).

Inverters are also classified based on the type of input source as follows:

- Voltage-source inverter (VSI): In this type of inverter, a constant voltage source acts as input to the inverter bridge. The constant voltage source is obtained by connecting a large capacitor across the DC source.
- Current-source inverter (CSI): In this type of inverter, a constant current source acts as input to the inverter bridge. The constant current source is obtained by connecting a large inductor in series with the DC source.

== Operation ==
Normally, three-phase inverters have 8 vector states (6 active states and 2 zero states). There is an additional state known as the shoot through state, during which the switches of one leg are short-circuited. In this state, energy is stored in the impedance network, and when the inverter is in its active state, the stored energy is transferred to the load, thus providing boost operation. This shoot through state is prohibited in VSI.

Achieving the buck-boost facility in ZSI requires pulse-width modulation. The normal sinusoidal pulse width modulation (SPWM) is generated by comparing carrier triangular wave with reference sine wave. For shoot through pulses, the carrier wave is compared with two complementary DC reference levels. These pulses are added in the SPWM. ZSI has two control freedoms: modulation index of the reference wave which is the ratio of amplitude of reference wave to amplitude of carrier wave and shoot through duty ratio which can be controlled by DC level.

== Advantages ==
The advantages of Z-source inverter are:

- The source can be either a voltage source or a current source. The DC source of a ZSI can be a battery, a diode rectifier or a thyristor converter, a fuel cell stack or a combination of these.
- The main circuit of a ZSI can either be the traditional VSI or the traditional CSI.
- Works as a buck-boost inverter.
- The load of a ZSC can be inductive or capacitive, or it can be another Z-source network.

== Applications ==
1. Renewable energy sources
2. Electric vehicles
3. Motor drives
