= Babu Chalamala =

- Born: India
- Occupation: Electrical Engineer
- Organization: Sandia National Laboratories
- Known for: Grid Energy Storage

Babu Chalamala is an American physicist and engineer currently serving as a Senior Scientist at Sandia National Laboratories. In 2024, he was elected as a member of the National Academy of Engineering.

== Education ==
Chalamala holds a B.Tech in Electronics and Communications Engineering from Sri Venkateswara University and a Ph.D. in Physics from the University of North Texas.

== Career ==
Chalamala has been involved in technology ventures related to lithium battery systems and digital x-ray sources. He has held research positions at Motorola and Texas Instruments and has been a Corporate Fellow at MEMC Electronic Materials, where he worked on research and development in energy storage technologies. From 2015 to 2023, he led the Energy Storage Technology and Systems Department at Sandia National Laboratory.

He is a Fellow of the Institute of Electrical and Electronics Engineers (IEEE), the American Association for the Advancement of Science (AAAS), and the National Academy of Inventors. He has served in leadership roles within the IEEE, including chairing the Energy Storage and Stationary Battery Committee of the IEEE Power and Energy Society and the Technical Committee on Displays of the IEEE Photonics Society. He has participated in editorial activities for journals such as MRS Bulletin, Proceedings of the IEEE, and IEEE Access, and currently serves as a Senior Editor for IEEE Access. He is also Lead Editor for a book series on grid energy storage published by Cambridge University Press. He has authored over 130 scientific publications and holds nine U.S. patents.

== Recognition ==
He received the IEEE Mortan Antler Lecture Award (2018), the James B. Eads Engineering Award from the Academy of Science of St. Louis (2015), and the ESIG Technical Excellence Award (2023).
