= Hirofumi Akagi =

Japanese electrical engineer

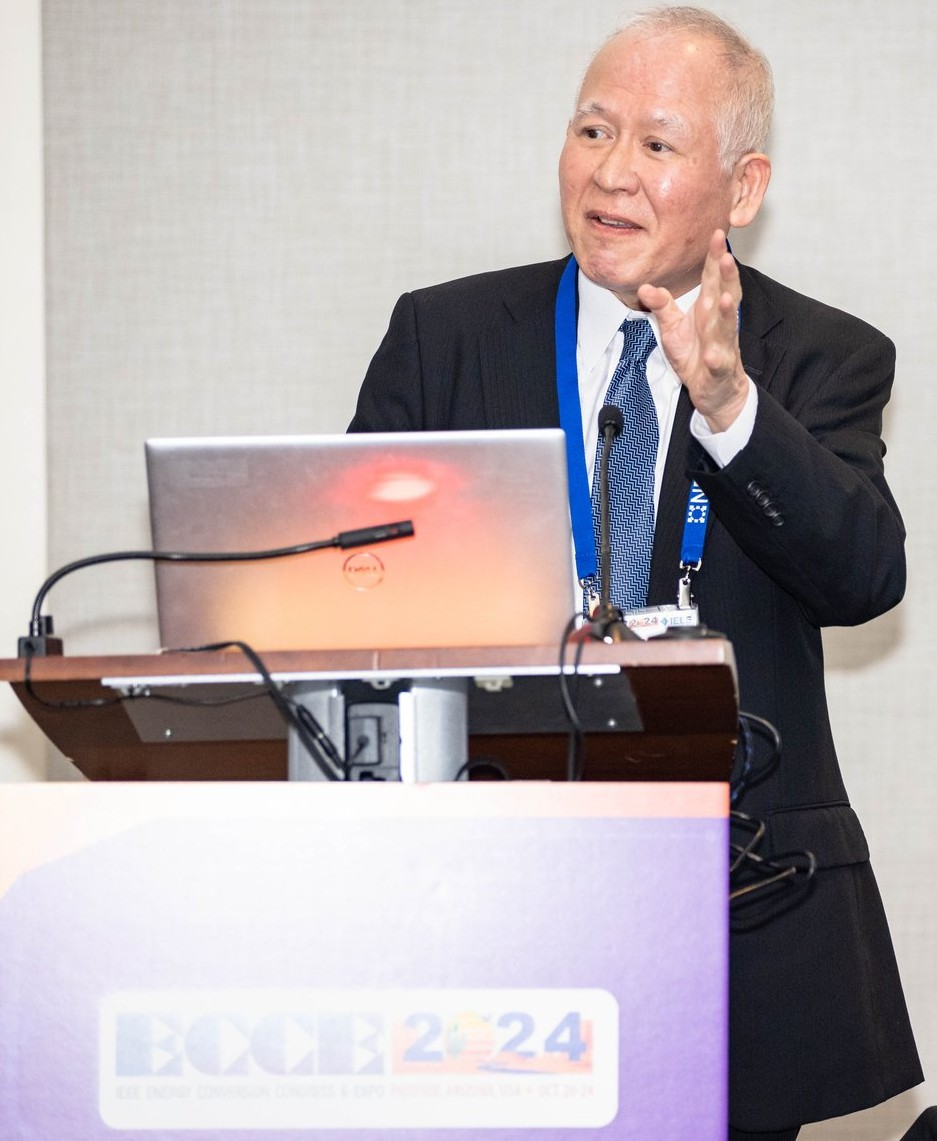
- Education: Tokyo Institute of Technology
- Known for: Power Electronics (p-q theory, active power filters)
- Awards: IEEE Medal in Power Engineering (2018), IEEE William E. Newell Power Electronics Award (2001), IEEE Fellow (1996)

Hirofumi Akagi (born in Okayama, Japan) is a Japanese electrical engineer and Distinguished Emeritus Professor at the Institute of Science Tokyo. He specializes in power electronics and power conversion systems. He developed the three-level neutral-point-clamped PWM inverters and the three-phase instantaneous power theory, commonly known as p-q theory.

== Early life and education ==
Akagi was born and raised in Okayama, Japan, where his father worked for the Japanese National Railways. Growing up with exposure to railway technology, including steam locomotives and electric trains, he later developed an interest in power conversion systems for transportation applications.

After graduating from a public senior high school, Akagi enrolled at the Nagoya Institute of Technology in 1970, where he pursued electrical engineering studies. During his undergraduate years, he developed a particular interest in electric power and energy systems, including electric motors and generators, control theory, and electric power system engineering.

Akagi was especially drawn to the semiconductor-based power conversion technology used to control DC motors in Japan's high-speed bullet trains and commuter trains. In April 1973, as a senior undergraduate student, he began conducting theoretical and experimental research on semiconductor-based power conversion circuits, systems, and applications. He completed his Bachelor of Science degree in electrical engineering in March 1974.

Akagi then pursued graduate studies at the Tokyo Institute of Technology, where he earned a Master of Science degree in electrical engineering in March 1976 and a Ph.D. degree in electrical engineering in March 1979. His research journey in power electronics began during his graduate studies, initially focusing on "control and harmonic analysis of line-commutated cycloconverters using thyristors."

== Awards and distinctions ==
- 2025:Elected to the US National Academy of Engineering
- 2018: IEEE Power Medal Award
- 2008: IEEE Richard Harold Kaufmann Award
- Four IEEE Transactions Prize Paper Awards
- 2004: IEEE Industry Applications Society Outstanding Achievement Award
- 2001: IEEE William E. Newell Power Electronics Award
- 1996: IEEE Fellowship
