= Alvin Trivelpiece =

American physicist (1931-2022)

Alvin William Trivelpiece (March 15, 1931 – August 7, 2022) was an American physicist whose varied career included positions as director of the Office of Energy Research of the U.S. Department of Energy (DOE), executive officer of the American Association for the Advancement of Science (AAAS), and director of Oak Ridge National Laboratory (ORNL). He was also a professor of physics and a corporate executive. Trivelpiece's research focused on plasma physics, controlled thermonuclear research, and particle accelerators. He received several patents for accelerators and microwave devices. He died in Rancho Santa Margarita, California in August 2022 at the age of 91.

== Education ==
He grew up in Stockton, California, an agricultural community, where he had only limited exposure to science. In 1948, after working as a construction lineman, he found himself unemployed and set off to hitchhike to New Orleans. Passing through San Luis Obispo, California, he stopped off to visit an aunt who lived there. She and her husband, who was a faculty member at California Polytechnic State University in San Luis Obispo, talked him into staying there and starting college. He graduated from "Cal Poly" in 1953 with a B.S. degree in electrical engineering, then continued his studies at the California Institute of Technology where he earned a Ph.D. in electrical engineering in 1958.

== Career ==
1958 – 1959—Fulbright Scholar in the Netherlands

1959 – 1966—Professor, Department of Electrical Engineering, University of California, Berkeley

1966 – 1976—Professor of Physics, University of Maryland

1967—Guggenheim Fellow

1973 – 1975—Assistant Director for Fusion Research, Division of Controlled Thermonuclear Research, U.S. Atomic Energy Commission (on leave from the University of Maryland)

1976 – 1978—Vice-president for engineering and research, Maxwell Laboratories, San Diego, CA

1978 – 1981—Corporate Vice-president, Science Applications, Inc., La Jolla, CA

1979—Trivelpiece co-founded the Fusion Power Associates, a fusion advocacy organization, with Stephen O. Dean and Nicholas Krall.

1981 – 1987—Director of the Office of Energy Research, U.S. Department of Energy (DOE)

During his early years as director of the DOE Office of Energy Research, Dr. Trivelpiece planned major projects and DOE facilities including,

- the Advanced Light Source (ALS) at Lawrence Berkeley National Laboratory (LBNL)
- the Advanced Photon Source (APS) at Argonne National Laboratory (ANL),
- the Relativistic Heavy Ion Collider (RHIC) at Brookhaven National Laboratory (BNL),
- the Continuous Electron Beam Accelerator Facility (CEBAF) at Thomas Jefferson National Accelerator Facility (TJNAF),
- what would become the Spallation Neutron Source (SNS) at Oak Ridge National Laboratory (ORNL)
- along with Evgeny Velikhov, laid the groundwork that led to the International Thermonuclear Experimental Reactor (ITER)

1987 (Apr) – 1989 (Jan)—Executive Officer, American Association for the Advancement of Science (AAAS)

1989 (Jan) – 2000 (Mar)—Director, Oak Ridge National Laboratory (ORNL), Oak Ridge, TN, where he was responsible for programs that included applied research and engineering development in support of the Department of Energy's fusion, fission, conservation, and fossil energy technology programs.

1989 – 1995—Vice-president, Martin Marietta Energy Systems

1996 – 2000—President, Lockheed Martin Energy Research Corporation

Beginning in May 2000, Dr. Trivelpiece was advisor to and/or chaired workshops/committees for several government laboratories and agencies, including Sandia National Laboratories and DOE's Office of Scientific and Technical Information (OSTI). Workshops chaired for DOE OSTI were in May 2000 and February 2007. The former considered issues related to communication, dissemination, and use of information in the physical sciences and made recommendations for increasing the productivity of the scientific enterprise in the United States. The latter focused on strategies to accelerate the spread of knowledge about science and technology.

== Human Genome Project ==
As a result of reports proposing the project and outlining its scope provided to him by Charles DeLisi, associate director of energy research for Health and Environmental Research, in fiscal year 1987. Trivelpiece supported, through the use of reprogrammed funds at DOE, the beginnings that led to the Human Genome Project.

An April 1987, DOE's Office of Health and Environmental Research (OHER) Health and Environmental Research Advisory Committee (HERAC) report recommended that DOE and the nation commit to a large, multidisciplinary, scientific, and technological undertaking to map and sequence the human genome. Earmarked spending began in Fiscal Year 1988 when the Human Genome Project was established by congressional action at both the National Institutes of Health (NIH) and DOE.

The chart used in the spring of 1986 by Trivelpiece to brief Deputy Secretary William F. Martin and Under Secretary Joseph Salgado regarding his intention to reprogram $4 million to initiate the Department's Human Genome Project is available here . This reprogramming was followed by a line item budget of $16 million the following year. This modest effort triggered the activities that led to the sequencing of the Human Genome. A letter from then Department of Energy Deputy Secretary William Flynn Martin accrediting these achievements to Dr. Trivelpiece can be seen here .

A speech given to the American Physical Society in 2005 by Dr. Trivelpiece on DOE's role in such major project can be seen here as well as his article on the same subject in the Fall 2005 Forum on the History of Physics Newsletter.

== Member ==
1986—Head of the U.S. Delegation to USSR on Peaceful Uses of Atomic Energy

1999—Chair, Science and Technology in KAZAKHSTAN :Current Status and Future Prospects, National Research Council's Committee on Science and Technology Policy Aspects of Selected Social and Economic Issues in Russia

1995 – 2000—Chair, Science and Technology Advisory Council for the State of Tennessee

1989 – 2001—Board of Directors of Bausch & Lomb

2000 – 2002—National Academy of Sciences Committee on the Technical Aspects of the Comprehensive Nuclear Test Ban Treaty

2005—Chair, Innovating for Profit in Russia: Summary of a Workshop

- American Nuclear Society
- American Association of University Professors
- Tau Beta Pi
- Sigma Xi

Fellow of the AAAS, the American Physical Society (APS), and the Institute of Electrical and Electronics Engineers (IEEE)

== Honors and awards ==
1978—Distinguished Alumnus of California Polytechnic

1987—Distinguished Alumnus of the California Institute of Technology

1987—Secretary of Energy Gold Medal for Distinguished Service

1993—Elected as a member into the National Academy of Engineering

== Publications ==
April 2007—Workshop Panel Report on Accelerating the Spread of Knowledge About Science and Technology: An Examination of the Needs and Opportunities (http://www.osti.gov/publications/2007/workshop.pdf)

May 2000—Workshop Report on a Future Information Infrastructure for the Physical Sciences – The Facts of the Matter: Finding, understanding, and using information about our physical world (http://www.osti.gov/physicalsciences/)

June 1995—Science, Environment and Technology Summit: A Long Term National Science Strategy—Testimony before the Subcommittee on Basic Research, Committee on Science, United States House of Representatives (http://www.osti.gov/energycitations/servlets/purl/104321-PXrd6E/webviewable/104321.pdf)

July 1990—Department of Energy National Laboratories—Testimony before the Subcommittee on Energy Research and Development, Committee on Energy And Natural Resources, United States Senate (http://www.osti.gov/energycitations/servlets/purl/6651726-JIAfxA/6651726.pdf)

April 1990—International Science and Technology Policies—Testimony before the Subcommittee on International Scientific Cooperation, Committee on Science, Space, and Technology, United States House of Representatives (http://www.osti.gov/energycitations/servlets/purl/7037883-POLCgj/7037883.pdf)

1982 – Experimental Investigations of the Propagation of Surface Waves Along a Plasma Column, with M. Moisan and A. Shivarova, Plasma Physics, vol 24, No. 11, pp. 1331–1400, 1982
