= Charles P. Steinmetz Memorial Lecture =

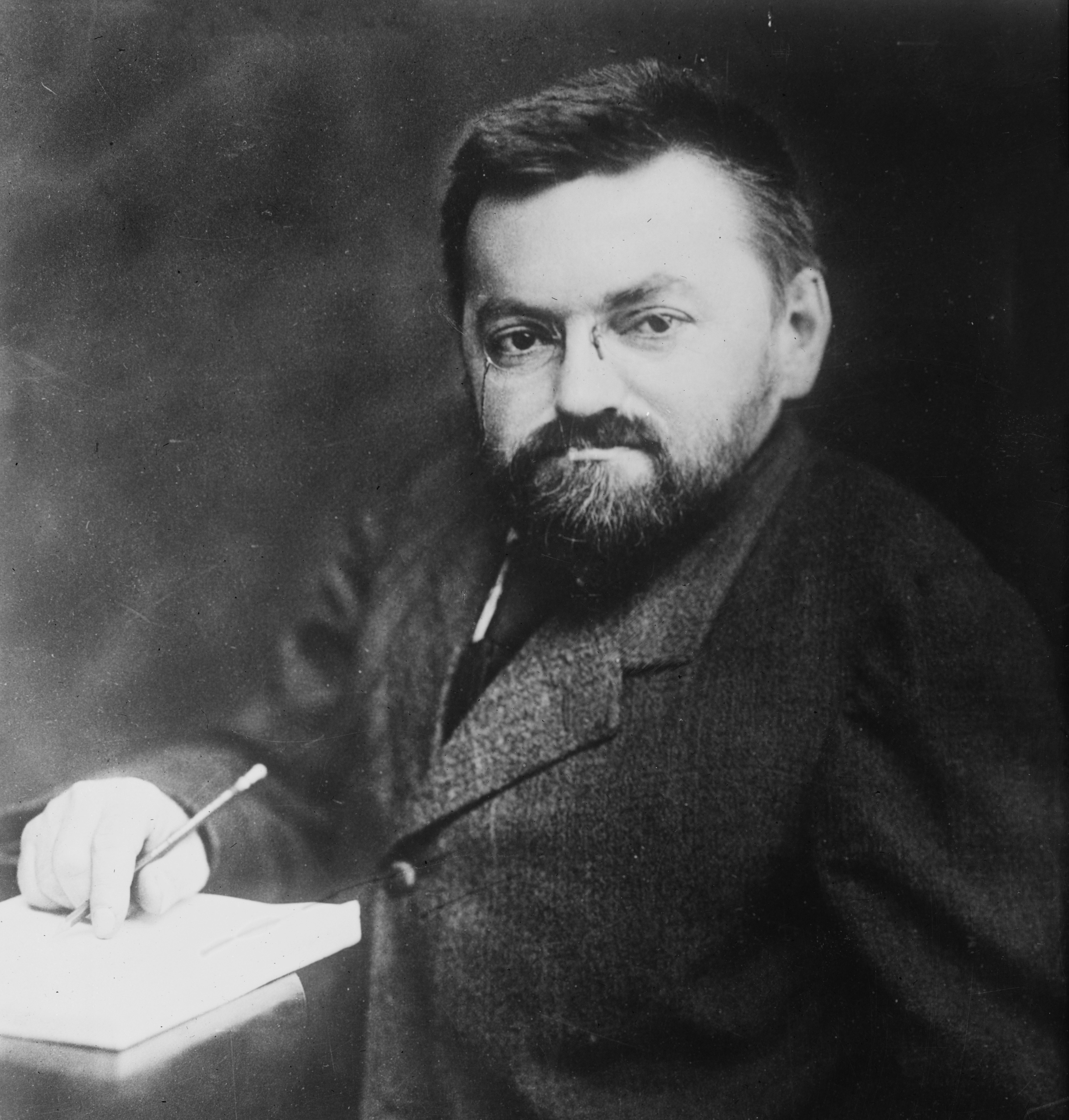
Steinmetz circa 1915

The Charles Proteus Steinmetz Memorial Lecture is a series of academic lectures initiated in 1925 in honor of celebrated mathematician and electrical engineer Charles Proteus Steinmetz. To date seventy four addresses have been given on subjects ranging from peace and educational reform to nanotechnology and solar photovoltaics.

The most recent, "The Evolution of the Smart Grid from Edison and Steinmetz", was delivered by Dr. Anjan Bose, Regents Professor at Washington State University, on October 2, 2018. It was hosted by Union College and is open to the general public.

== History ==
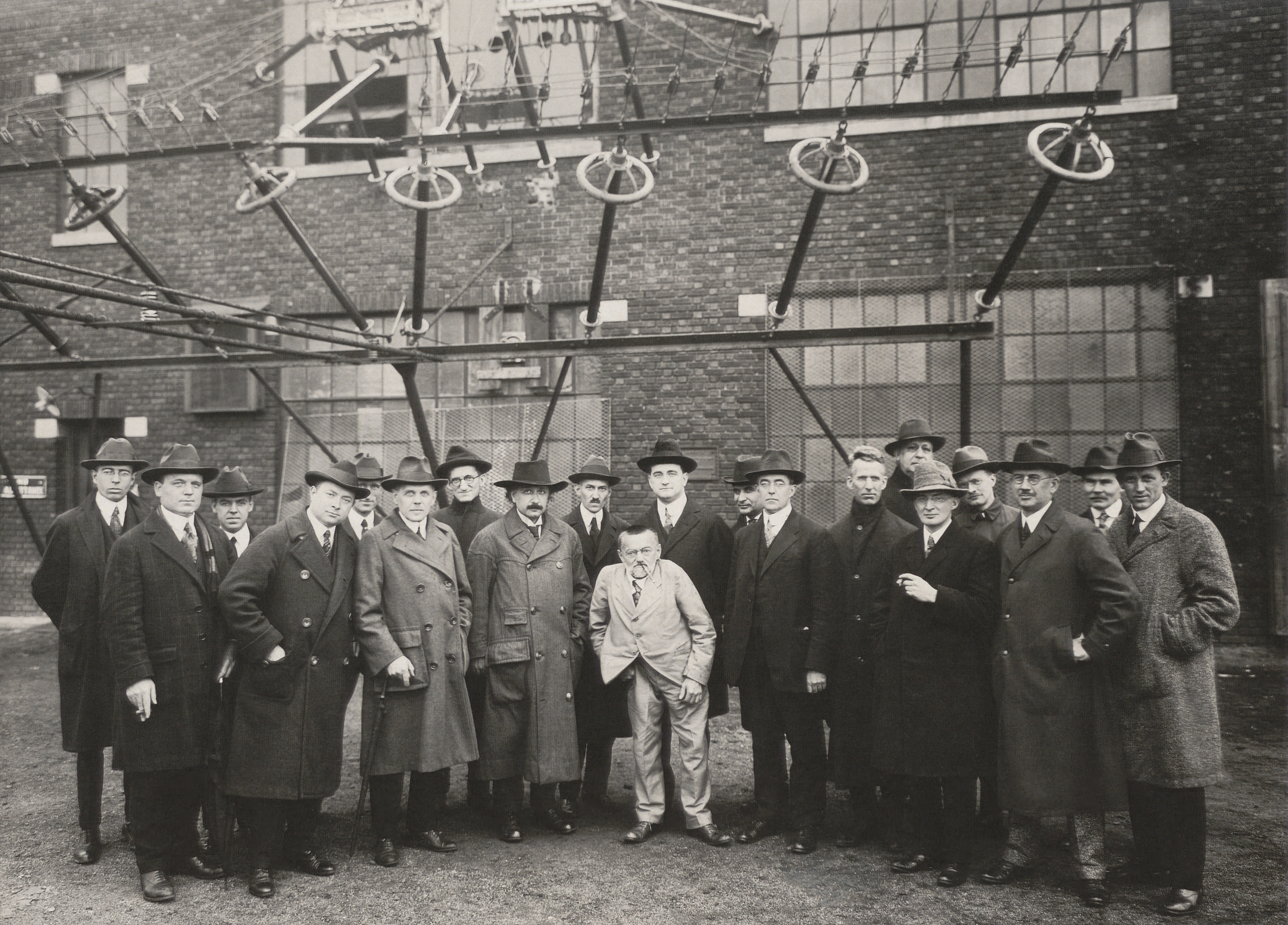
Group being given a tour of the Marconi Wireless Station in Somerset, New Jersey, in 1921, Steinmetz (center), Albert Einstein (to his right)

Shortly after Steinmetz's death at 58 in 1923, his friends and admirers, including prominent figures at General Electric in Schenectady, New York, endowed the series. It is overseen by the Schenectady Section of the Institute of Electrical and Electronics Engineers and hosted by Union College, where Steinmetz long held a professorship. Among those receiving the honor of delivering the lecture have been such notables as Nobel laureate experimental physicist Robert A. Millikan (1927), helicopter inventor Igor Sikorsky (1938), nuclear submarine pioneer Admiral Hyman G. Rickover (1963), Nobel-winning semiconductor inventor William Shockley (1966), and Internet 'founding father' Leonard Kleinrock (2010).

== Honorees ==
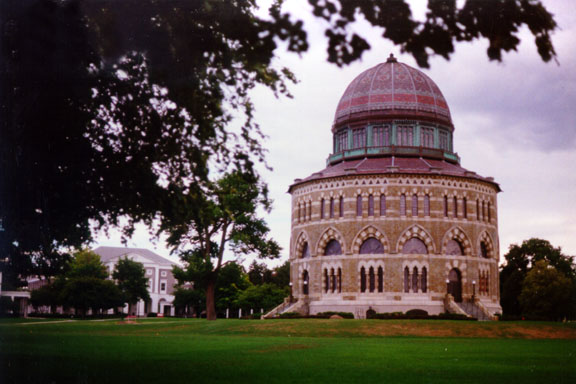
Union College, host of the lecture series

The featured lecturers of the Steinmetz series have included:

- 1 – Mihajlo I. Pupin (1925)
- 2 – Ernst J. Berg (1926)
- 3 – Robert A. Millikan (1927)
- 4 – Max Mason (1928)
- 5 – Dexter S. Kimball (1929)
- 6 – William E. Wickenden (1930)
- 7 – Karl T. Compton (1932)
- 8 – C. E. Kenneth Mees (1934)
- 9 – Robert E. Doherty (1935)
- 10 – Gerard Swope (1936)
- 11 – Harold G. Moulton (1937)
- 12 – Igor I. Sikorsky (1938)
- 13 – Frank B. Jewett (1939)
- 14 – Frank Howard Lahey (1941)
- 15 – Comfort A. Adams (1942)
- 16 – Harold Willis Dodds (1943)
- 17 – Stephen S. Wise (1944)
- 18 – Irving Langmuir (1945)
- 19 – Sanford A. Moss (1946)
- 20 – Arthur H. Compton (1947)
- 21 – Philip Sporn (1948)
- 22 – Kirtley F. Mather (1949)
- 23 – Charles E. Wilson (1950)
- 24 – Hollis L. Caswell (1952)
- 25 – Harold S. Osborne (1953)
- 26 – Charles A. Thomas (1954)
- 27 – Bishop G. Bromley Oxnam (1955)
- 28 – Cornelius Packard Rhodes (1956)
- 29 – Admiral William Morrow Fechteler, Ph.D. (1957)
- 30 – Joseph Allen Hynek (1958)
- 31 – Simon Ramo (1959)
- 32 – Lillian M. Gilbreth (1960)
- 33 – Claude E. Shannon (1962)
- 34 – Vice-Admiral H.G. Rickover (1963)
- 35 – J. Herbert Hollomon (1964)
- 36 – Walker Lee Cisler (1965)
- 37 – William Shockley (1966)
- 38 – Edward C. Welsh (1967)
- 39 – Ralph W. Sockman (1968)
- 40 – J. Erik Jonsson (1969)
- 41 – Lelan F. Sillin, Jr. (1970)
- 42 – Patrick E. Haggerty 1971)
- 43 – Harold W. Bibber, Emil J. Remscheid, & Joseph S. Hayden (1972)
- 44 – John Bardeen (1973)
- 45 – Richard W. Roberts (1975)
- 46 – Jay W. Forrester (1976)
- 47 – Hans A. Bethe (1977)
- 48 – Merril Eisenbud (1978)
- 49 – Myron Tribus (1979)
- 50 – Reginald H. Jones (1980)
- 51 – Margaret N. Maxey (1983)
- 52 – Roland W. Schmitt (1984)
- 53 – Erich Bloch (1985)
- 54 – Ivar Giaever (1986)
- 55 – Ernest L. Boyer (1987)
- 56 – Benoit B. Mandelbrot (1988)
- 57 – Robert M. White (1989)
- 58 – Eleanor Baum (1990)
- 59 – Walter L. Robb (1991)
- 60 – Andrew C. Kadak (1992)
- 61 – Ray Dolby (1993)
- 62 – Jerrier A. Haddad (1994)
- 63 – Edward A. Parrish (1995)
- 64 – William W. Hogan (1996)
- 65 – Charles Concordia (2001)
- 66 – Paul M. Horn (2003)
- 67 – Dennis Woodford (2005)
- 68 – William Wulf (2007)
- 69 – Tod Machover (2008)
- 70 – Lawrence A. Kazmerski (2009)
- 71 – Leonard Kleinrock (2010)
- 72 – Mildred Dresselhaus (2012)
- 73 – Lynn Conway (2015)
- 74 – Anjan Bose (2018)

== See also ==
- IEEE Charles Proteus Steinmetz Award
- Steinmetz's equation
- Steinmetz solid
- Steinmetz equivalent circuit
