= Steinmetz curve =

Intersection of two cylinders

Steinmetz curves for various cases

Steinmetz solid (intersection of two cylinders) involving Steinmetz curves (purple)

A Steinmetz curve is the curve of intersection of two right circular cylinders of radii $a$ and $b,$ whose axes intersect perpendicularly. In case of $a=b$ the Steinmetz curves are the edges of a Steinmetz solid. If the cylinder axes are the x- and y-axes and $a\le b$, then the Steinmetz curves are given by the parametric equations:

$$\begin{align}
x (t) & = a \cos  t \\
y (t) & = \pm \sqrt{b^2 - a^2 \sin^2 t} \\
z (t) & =  a \sin t
\end{align}$$

It is named after mathematician Charles Proteus Steinmetz, along with Steinmetz's equation, Steinmetz solids, and Steinmetz equivalent circuit theory.

In the case when the two cylinders have equal radii the curve degenerates to two intersecting ellipses.

== See also ==
- Cylinder
