= Groin vault =

Architectural feature

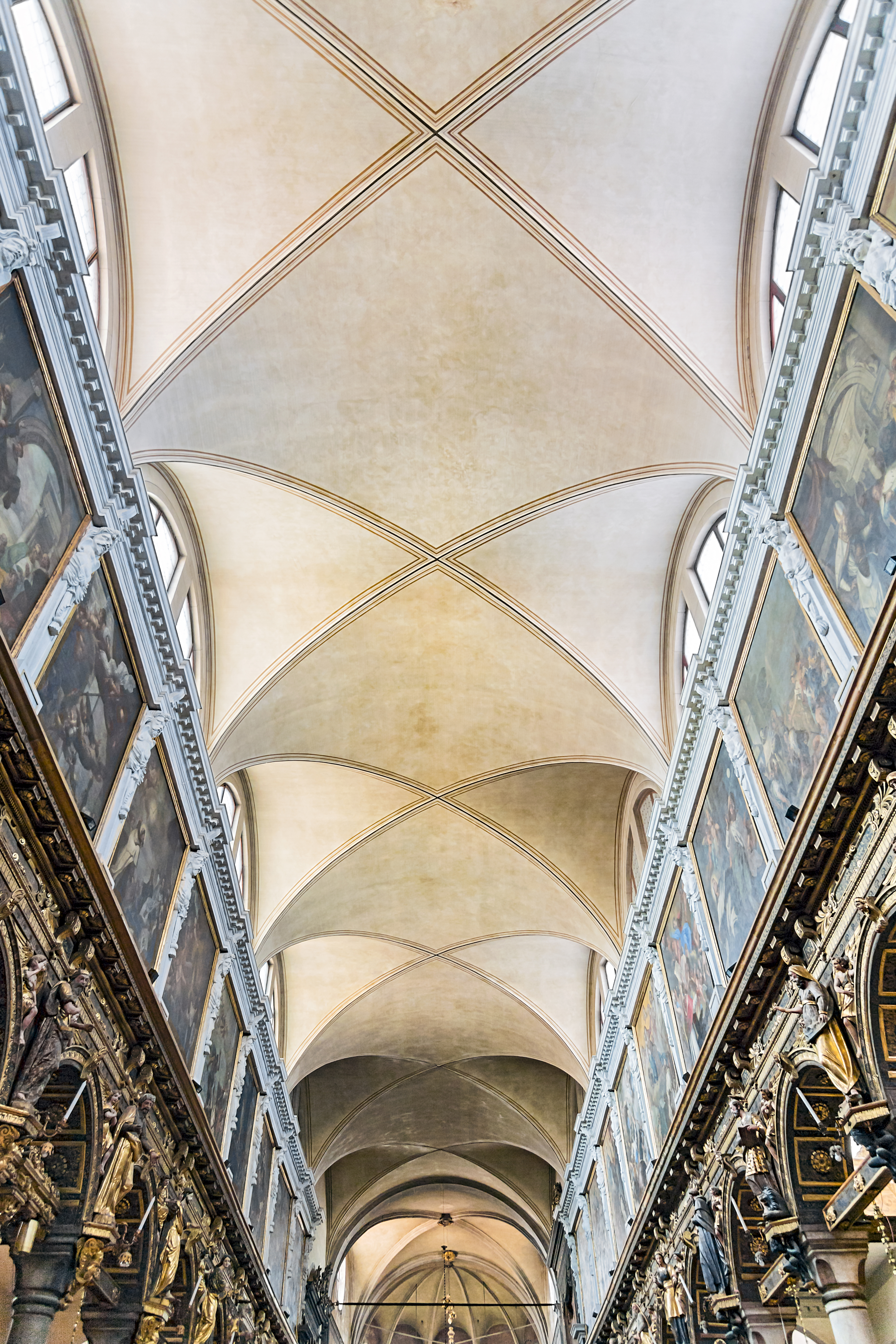
Renaissance groin vault in the church of Santa Maria dei Carmini in Venice

A groin vault or groined vault (also sometimes known as a double barrel vault or cross vault) is produced by the intersection at right angles of two barrel vaults. The word "groin" refers to the edge between the intersecting vaults. Sometimes the arches of groin vaults are pointed instead of round. In comparison with a barrel vault, a groin vault provides good economies of material and labor. The thrust is concentrated along the groins or arrises (the four diagonal edges formed along the points where the barrel vaults intersect), so the vault need only be abutted at its four corners.

Groin vault construction was first employed by the Romans, but then fell into relative obscurity in Europe until the resurgence of quality stone building brought about by Carolingian and Romanesque architecture. It was superseded by the more flexible rib vaults of Gothic architecture in the later Middle Ages. Difficult to construct neatly because of the geometry of the cross groins (usually elliptical in cross section), the groin vault required great skill in cutting stone to form a neat arris. This difficulty, in addition to the formwork required to create such constructions, led to the rib vault superseding the groin vault as the preferred solution for enclosing space in Gothic architecture.

The construction method was particularly common on the basement level, such as at Myres Castle in Scotland, or at the ground floor level for the storerooms as at Muchalls Castle in Scotland.

== History ==
While the barrel vault was more common than the groin vault in very early architecture, including Roman and even earlier civilizations, the Romans developed the groin vault widely for applications in a variety of structures, some with significant span widths. The first groin vault in Europe was, however, constructed in Delphi by King Attalos I of Pergamon some time between 241 and 197 BC, quite possibly in 223 BC. Their application of groin vaults to vast halls like the frigidaria in the Baths of Caracalla and Diocletian became highly influential in church architecture in the Middle Ages. The aspirations of church building reached its zenith then, and the groin vault was pursued aggressively for its ability to create strength, without massive buttress formations; in addition, it provided the church architects a remedy for the dim illumination inherent in the barrel vault design, since the barrel vault had to minimise fenestration (window openings) to retain adequate strength.

Twentieth-century structural engineers have studied the static stress forces of the groin vault design and validated the Romans' foresight in an efficient design to accomplish the multiple goals of minimum materials use, wide span of construction, ability to achieve lateral illumination, and avoidance of lateral stresses. A seminal modern design is the largest European train station, Hauptbahnhof in Berlin, which features an entrance building with a glass-spanned groin vault design.

== Comparison with other vault designs ==
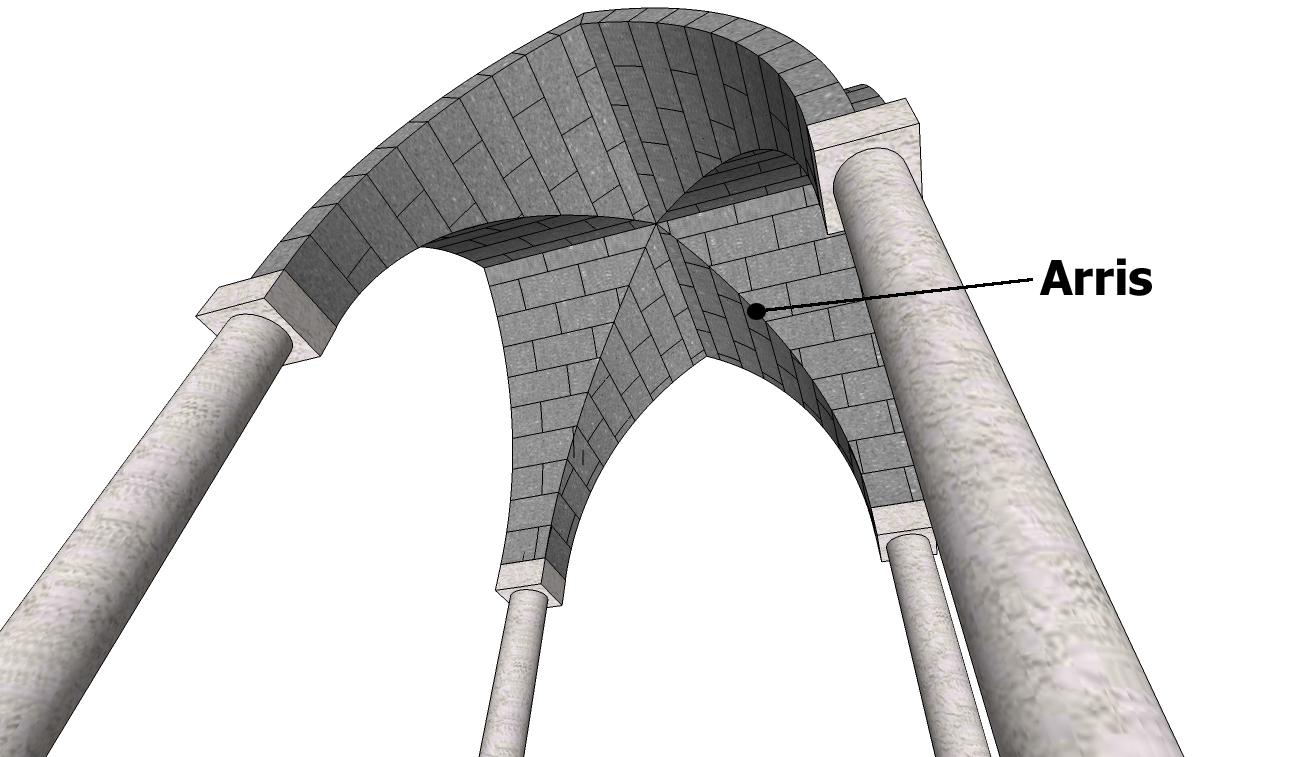
A groin vault (with pointed Gothic profile) viewed from the underside, showing the arris or 'groin'

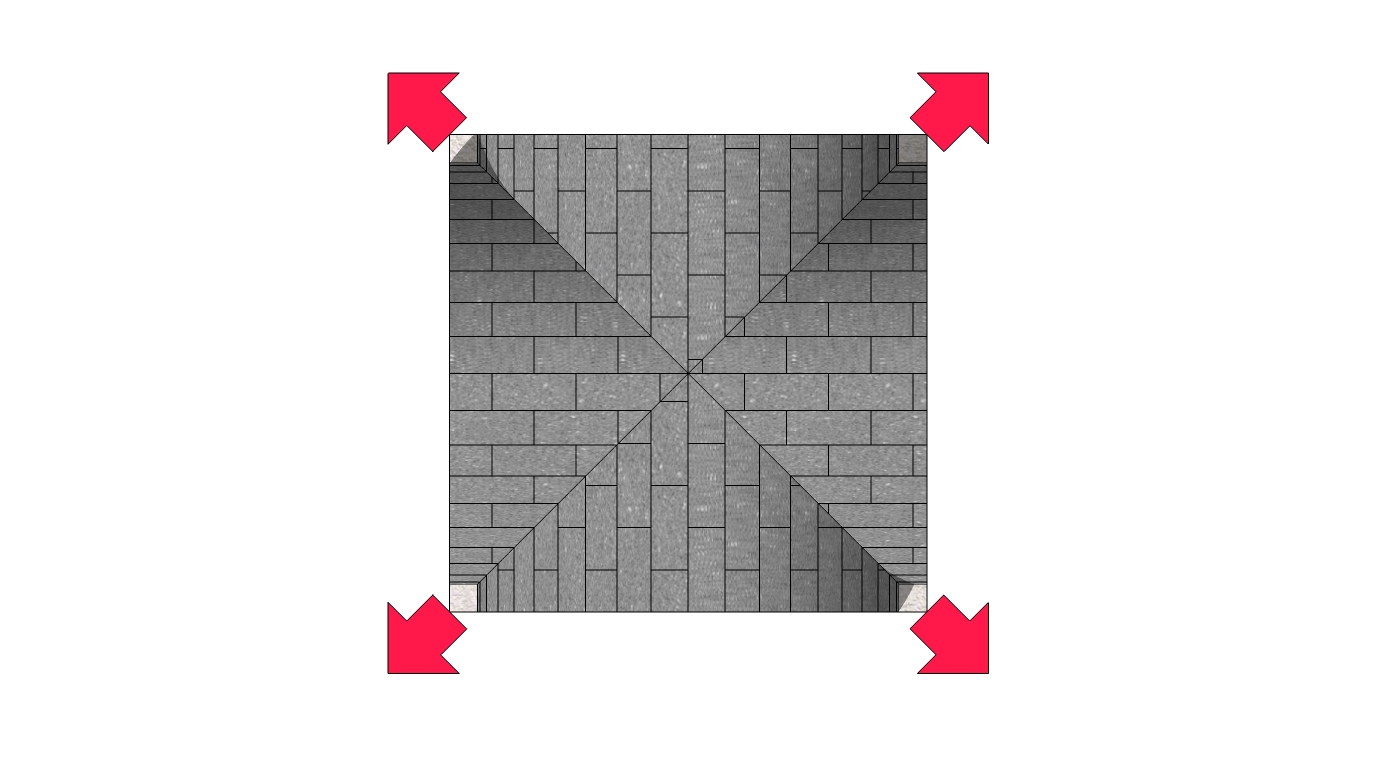
Plan of the vault from above showing resultant outward thrust

The construction of a groin vault can be understood most simply by visualising two barrel vault sections at right angles merging to form a squarish unit. The resulting four ribs convey the stress loading to the four corners, or piers. The more complex groin vault is intrinsically a stronger design compared to the barrel vault, since the barrel vault structure must rest on long walls creating less stable lateral stress, whereas the groin vault design can direct stresses almost purely vertically on the piers. A common association of vaulting in cathedrals of the Middle Ages involves a nave of barrel vault design with transepts of groined vaulting. Rib vaults resemble groin vaults but introduce structural ribs running along the angles which carry much of the weight, making possible much greater variations of proportion.

== Examples ==
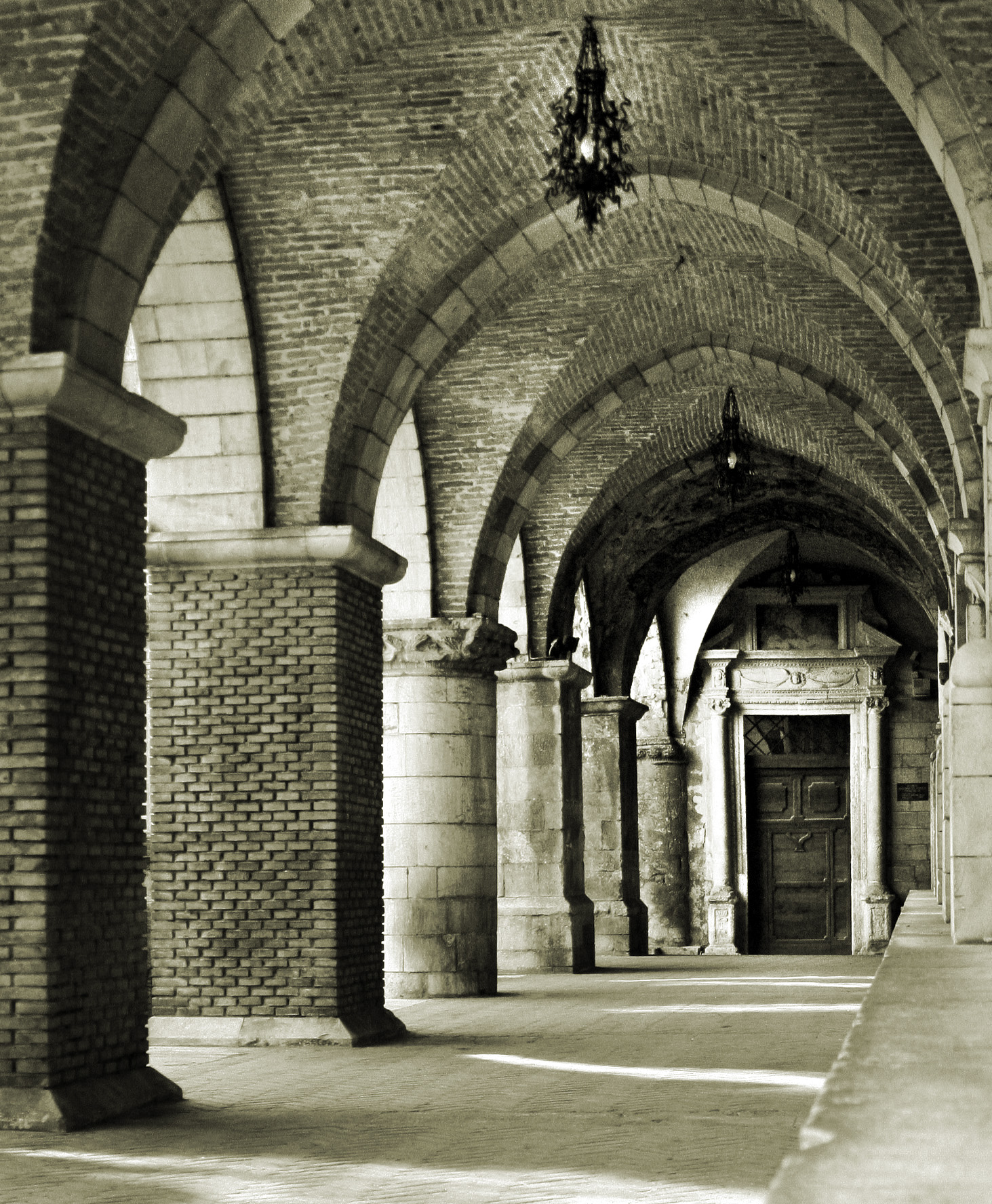
Santa Maria Maggiore at Guardiagrele in Abruzzo

- Baths of Caracalla, Rome, Italy, early 3rd century AD 32.9 meter high groined structure
- Charlemagne's Palatine Chapel in Aachen, Germany
- Santa Maria Maggiore di Firenze, Florence, Italy, 11th-century church
- Basilica of Sant'Ambrogio, Milan, Italy
- Old Cathedral of Coimbra, Coimbra, Portugal, lateral aisles, 12th century
- Muchalls Castle, Scotland, ground floor rooms from the 14th century
- All early Russian palaces, including the Palace of Facets (1487–1491)
- Church of St. Triphon at Ivan III's suburban estate of Naprudnoe, near Moscow, 1490s
- Three churches of the Rostov kremlin, 1670s and 1680s
- Exchange and Provost (Provost Dungeon), Charleston, South Carolina, 1771
- New Orleans Mint, New Orleans, Louisiana, 1838
- Aztec Center San Diego State, San Diego, California, 1968 now demolished.
- Basilica Minore de San Sebastián in Quiapo, Manila, Philippines.

== See also ==
- List of architectural vaults
- Tower house
- Steinmetz solid
