= Charles Proteus Steinmetz =

American mathematician and electrical engineer (1865–1923)

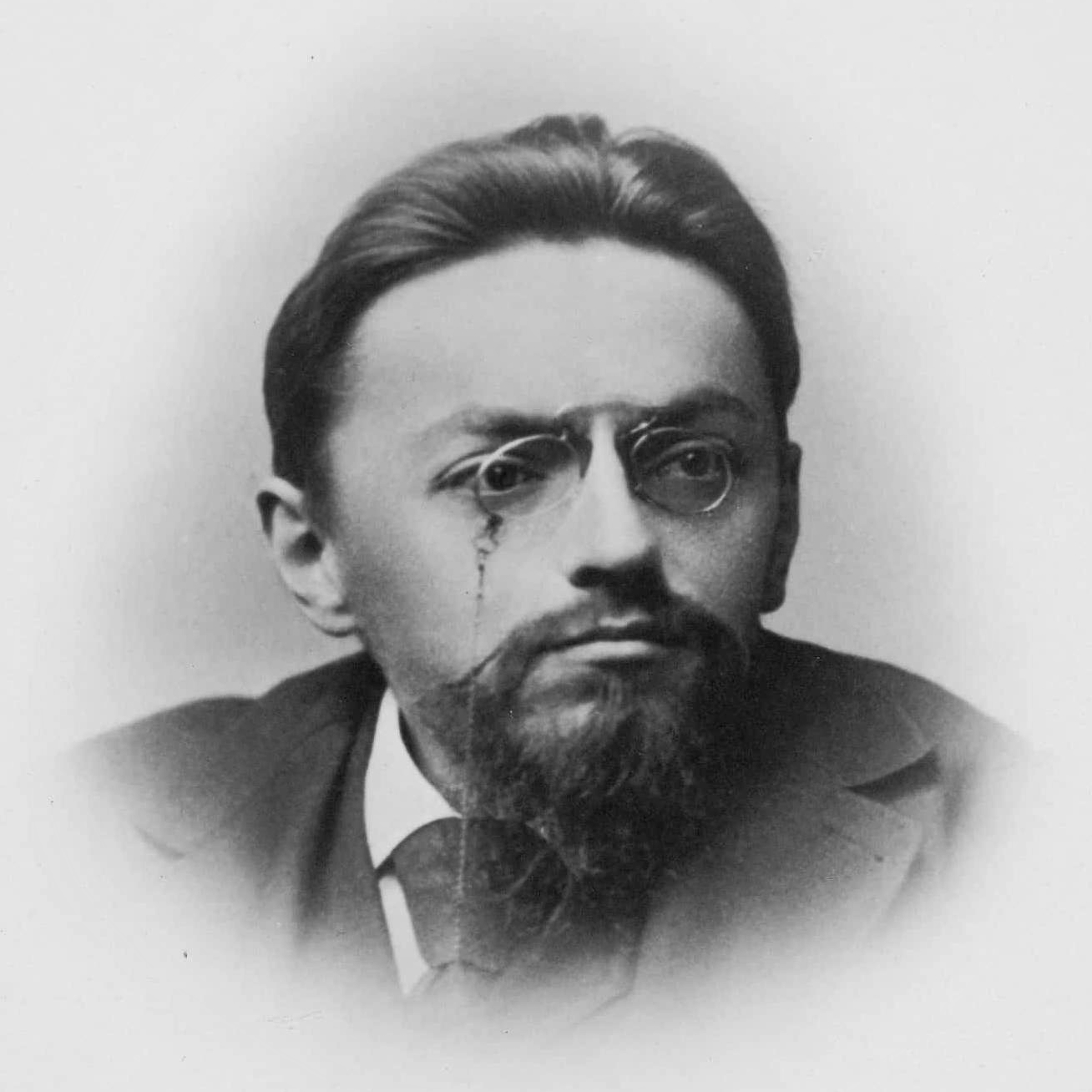
- Born: Karl August Rudolph Steinmetz; April 9, 1865; Breslau, Province of Silesia, Prussia
- Died: October 26, 1923 (aged 58); Schenectady, New York, United States
- Resting place: Vale Cemetery
- Education: University of Breslau; Union College (doctorate)
- Occupations: Mathematician and electrical engineer
- Known for: Steinmetz curve; Steinmetz's equation; Steinmetz equivalent circuit; Steinmetz solid; Alternating current; Electric power industry; Hysteresis; Mechanicville Hydroelectric Plant; Metal-halide lamp; Network synthesis filters; Passive analogue filter development; Phasor measurement unit; Transmission line; Wireless power; Engineering education
- Awards: Elliott Cresson Medal (1913); Cedergren Medal (1914)
- Scientific career
- Workplaces: Union College; General Electric

Charles Proteus Steinmetz (born Karl August Rudolph Steinmetz; April 9, 1865 – October 26, 1923) was a Prussian-American mathematician and electrical engineer and professor at Union College. He fostered the development of alternating current that made possible the expansion of the electric power industry in the United States, formulating mathematical theories for engineers. He made ground-breaking discoveries in the understanding of hysteresis that enabled engineers to design better electromagnetic apparatus equipment, especially electric motors for use in industry. (Note: Quoting from Alger, "Steinmetz was truly the patron saint of the GE motor business.")

At the time of his death, Steinmetz held over 200 patents. A genius in both mathematics and electronics, he did work that earned him the nicknames "Forger of Thunderbolts" and "The Wizard of Schenectady." Steinmetz's equation, Steinmetz solids, Steinmetz curves, and Steinmetz equivalent circuit are all named after him, as are numerous honors and scholarships, including the IEEE Charles Proteus Steinmetz Award, one of the highest technical recognitions given by the Institute of Electrical and Electronics Engineers professional society.

== Early life and education ==
Steinmetz was born Karl August Rudolph Steinmetz on April 9, 1865, in Breslau, Province of Silesia, Prussia (now Wrocław, Poland), the son of Caroline (Neubert) and Karl Heinrich Steinmetz. He was baptized as a Lutheran into the Evangelical Church of Prussia. Steinmetz, who stood only 4 ft 0 in (1.22 m) tall as an adult, had dwarfism, hunchback, and hip dysplasia, as did his father and grandfather. Steinmetz graduated with honors from St. John's Gymnasium in 1882.

Following Gymnasium, Steinmetz studied at the University of Breslau to begin work on his undergraduate degree in 1883. Nearing completion of his doctorate in 1888, he was forced to flee to Zurich, Switzerland, as the German government was preparing to prosecute him for his socialist activities.

== Political persecution and emigration ==
As socialist meetings and press had been banned in Germany, Steinmetz fled to Zurich in 1889 to escape possible arrest. Cornell University Professor Ronald R. Kline, author of Steinmetz: Engineer and Socialist, points to other factors which reinforced Steinmetz's decision to leave his homeland such as financial problems and the prospect of a more harmonious life with his socialist friends and supporters than the stressful domestic circumstances of his father's household.

Faced with an expiring visa, he emigrated to the United States in 1889 at the age of 24. He changed his first name to "Charles" to sound more American, and chose the middle name "Proteus," a wise hunchbacked character from the Odyssey who knew many secrets, after an epithet bestowed upon him by his college fraternity brothers.

== Political activism and beliefs ==
Steinmetz was politically active in the US as a technocratic socialist for over thirty years. Following the Bolshevik introduction of a technocratic plan to electrify Russia, Steinmetz spoke of Lenin alongside Albert Einstein as the "two greatest minds of our time." He believed in a corporatist industrial government also covering its human welfare function.

A member of the original Technical Alliance, which also included Thorstein Veblen and Leland Olds, Steinmetz had great faith in the ability of machines to eliminate human toil and create abundance for all. He put it this way: "Some day we [will] make the good things of life for everybody." Steinmetz's techno-utopian optimism was deeply intertwined with his political beliefs, and he was convinced that the spread of electrification would inevitably steer human society toward socialism.

== Electrical engineering ==
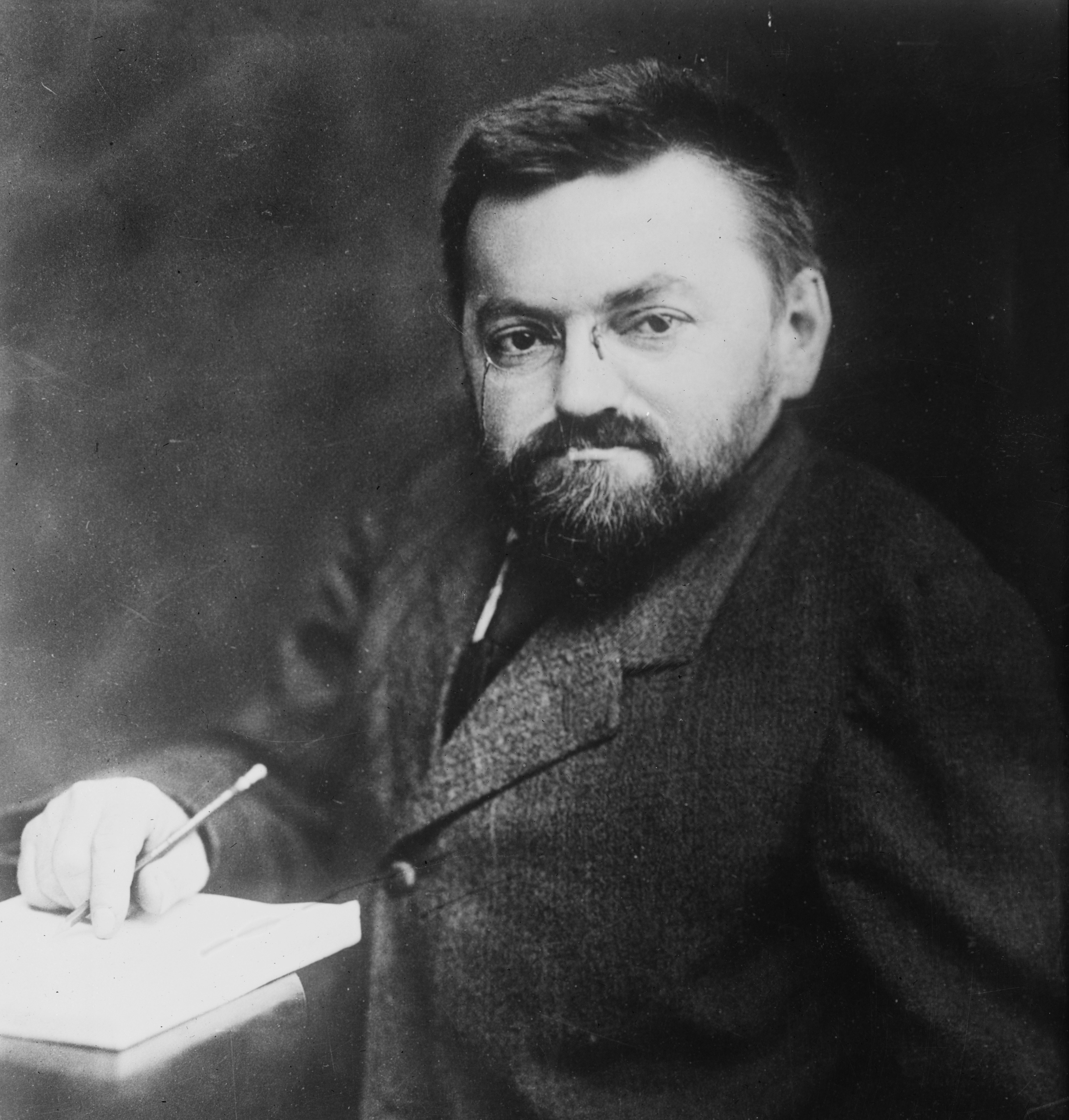
Steinmetz circa 1915

Steinmetz is known for his contribution in three major fields of alternating current (AC) systems theory: hysteresis, steady-state analysis, and transients.

=== AC hysteresis theory ===
Shortly after arriving in the United States, Steinmetz went to work for Rudolf Eickemeyer in Yonkers, New York, and published in the field of magnetic hysteresis, earning worldwide professional recognition. Eickemeyer's firm developed transformers for use in the transmission of electrical power among many other mechanical and electrical devices. In 1893 Eickemeyer's company, along with all of its patents and designs, was bought by the newly formed General Electric Company, where Steinmetz quickly became known as the engineering wizard in GE's engineering community.

=== AC steady state circuit theory ===
Steinmetz's work revolutionized AC circuit theory and analysis, which had been carried out using complicated, time-consuming calculus-based methods. In the groundbreaking paper, "Complex Quantities and Their Use in Electrical Engineering," presented at a July 1893 meeting published in the American Institute of Electrical Engineers (AIEE), Steinmetz simplified these complicated methods to "a simple problem of algebra." He systematized the use of complex number phasor representation in electrical engineering education texts, whereby the lower-case letter "j" is used to designate the 90-degree rotation operator in AC system analysis. His seminal books and many other AIEE papers "taught a whole generation of engineers how to deal with AC phenomena."

=== AC transient theory ===
Steinmetz also greatly advanced the understanding of lightning. His systematic experiments resulted in the first laboratory-created "man-made lightning", earning him the nickname "Forger of Thunderbolts." These were conducted in a football-field-sized laboratory at General Electric, using 120 000-volt generators. Like alternating-current pioneer Nikola Tesla, he also erected a lightning tower to attract natural lightning to study its patterns and effects, which resulted in several theories.

== Professional life ==
Steinmetz acted in the following professional capacities:

- At Union College, as chair of electrical engineering from 1902 to 1913 and as faculty member thereafter until his death in 1923
- Board member on the Schenectady Board of Education for six years, including four years as the board's president
- President of the Common Council of Schenectady
- President of the American Institute of Electrical Engineers from 1901 to 1902
- First vice-president of the International Association of Municipal Electricians (IAME) {which later became the International Municipal Signal Association (IMSA)} from 1913 until his death in 1923.

He was granted an honorary degree from Harvard University in 1901 and a doctorate from Union College in 1903.; other awards include the Certificate of Merit of Franklin Institute, 1908; the Elliott Cresson Medal, 1913; and the Cedergren Medal, 1914. Steinmetz was also an elected member of both the American Academy of Arts and Sciences and the American Philosophical Society.

Steinmetz wrote 13 books and 60 articles, not exclusively about engineering. He was a member and adviser to the fraternity Phi Gamma Delta at Union College, whose chapter house was one of the first electrified residences.

While serving as president of the Schenectady Board of Education, Steinmetz introduced numerous progressive reforms, including extended school hours, school meals, school nurses, special classes for the children of immigrants, and the distribution of free textbooks.

== Personal life ==
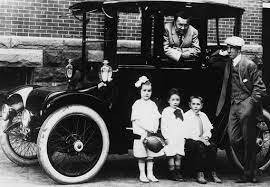
Steinmetz posed inside his 1914 Detroit Electric automobile behind some members of his adopted family. From left to right are grandchildren Midge, Billy, and Joe Hayden, and adopted son Joseph LeRoy Hayden.

Steinmetz had dwarfism, standing only 4 ft 0 in (1.22 m) tall as an adult, and was affected by kyphosis like his father and grandfather. In spite of his love for children and family life, Steinmetz remained unmarried, to prevent his spinal deformity from being passed to any offspring.

When Joseph LeRoy Hayden, a loyal and hardworking lab assistant, announced that he would marry and look for his own living quarters, Steinmetz made the unusual proposal of opening his large home, complete with research lab, greenhouse, and office to the Haydens and their prospective family. Hayden favored the idea, but his future wife was wary of the unorthodox arrangement. She agreed after Steinmetz's assurance that she could run the house as she saw fit.

After an uneasy start, the arrangement worked well for all parties, especially after three Hayden children were born. Steinmetz legally adopted Joseph Hayden as his son, becoming grandfather to the youngsters, entertaining them with fantastic stories and spectacular scientific demonstrations. The unusual, harmonious living arrangement lasted for the rest of Steinmetz's life.

In 1894, Steinmetz founded the Mohawk Aerial Navigation Company (Ltd.), which became the first practical, active gliding club in the world. But none of its prototypes flew. (Note: He founded the Mohawk Aerial Navigation Company, Ltd. Steinmetz also partnered with others to establish the Mohawk River Aerial Navigation, Transportation, and Exploration Company, Unlimited.)

Steinmetz was a lifelong agnostic. (Note: Quoting from Hammond, "This has placed him before the public as an atheist.* The title he did not deny. The writer put him down as a confirmed agnostic, for an atheist is a person who knows there is no God, and Steinmetz was not of that...") He died on October 26, 1923, at the age of 58 and was buried in Vale Cemetery in Schenectady.

== Legacy ==
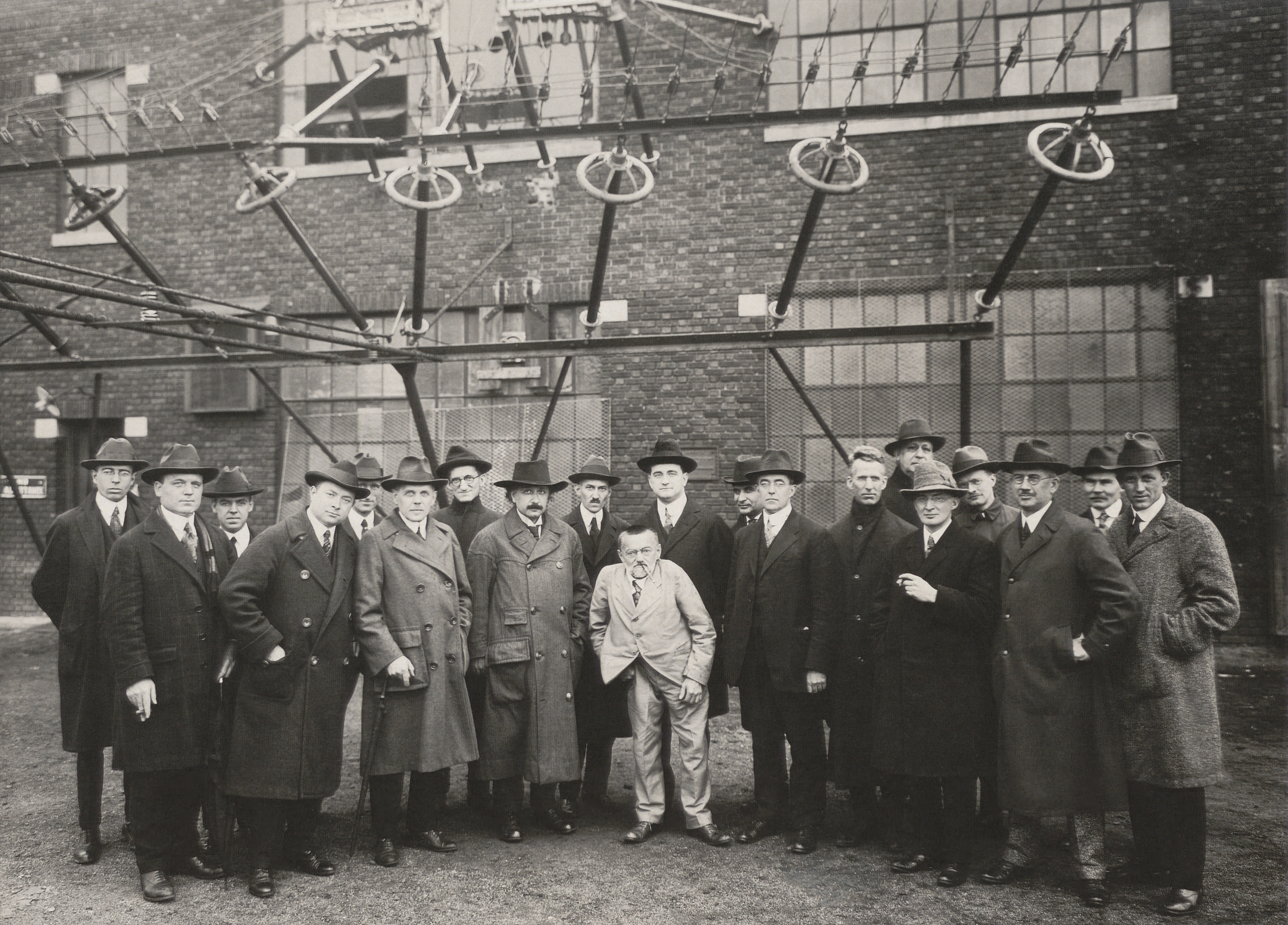
Group tour of the Marconi Wireless Station in Somerset, New Jersey, in 1921, including Steinmetz (center) and Albert Einstein (to his right)

Steinmetz earned wide recognition among the scientific community and numerous awards and honors both during his life and posthumously.

Steinmetz's equation, derived from his experiments, defines the approximate heat energy released due to magnetic hysteresis, per cycle per unit volume of magnetic material. A Steinmetz solid is the solid body generated by the intersection of two or three cylinders of equal radius at right angles. Steinmetz's equivalent circuit is still widely used for the design and testing of induction machines.

One of the highest technical recognitions given by the Institute of Electrical and Electronics Engineers, the "IEEE Charles Proteus Steinmetz Award," is given for major contributions to standardization within the field of electrical and electronics engineering.

The Charles P. Steinmetz Memorial Lecture series was begun in his honor in 1925, sponsored by the Schenectady branch of the IEEE. Through 2017 seventy-three gatherings have taken place, held almost exclusively at Union College, featuring notable figures such as Nobel laureate experimental physicist Robert A. Millikan, helicopter inventor Igor Sikorsky, nuclear submarine pioneer Admiral Hyman G. Rickover (1963), Nobel-winning semiconductor inventor William Shockley, and Internet "founding father" Leonard Kleinrock.

Steinmetz's connection to Union is further celebrated with the annual Steinmetz Symposium, a day-long event in which Union undergraduates give presentations on research they have done. Steinmetz Hall, which houses the Union College computer center, is named after him.

The Charles P. Steinmetz Scholarship is awarded annually by the college, underwritten since its inception in 1923 by the General Electric Company. An additional Charles P. Steinmetz Memorial Scholarship was later established at Union by Marjorie Hayden, daughter of Joseph and Corrine Hayden, and is awarded to students majoring in engineering or physics.

A 1914 "Duplex Drive Brougham" Detroit Electric automobile that once belonged to Steinmetz was purchased by Union College in 1971, and restored for use in campus ceremonies. The Steinmetz car is permanently displayed in the first-floor corridor between the Wold Center and F.W. Olin building.

A Chicago public high school, Steinmetz College Prep, is named for him, as well as a Schenectady public school, the Steinmetz Career and Leadership Academy, formerly Steinmetz Middle-School.

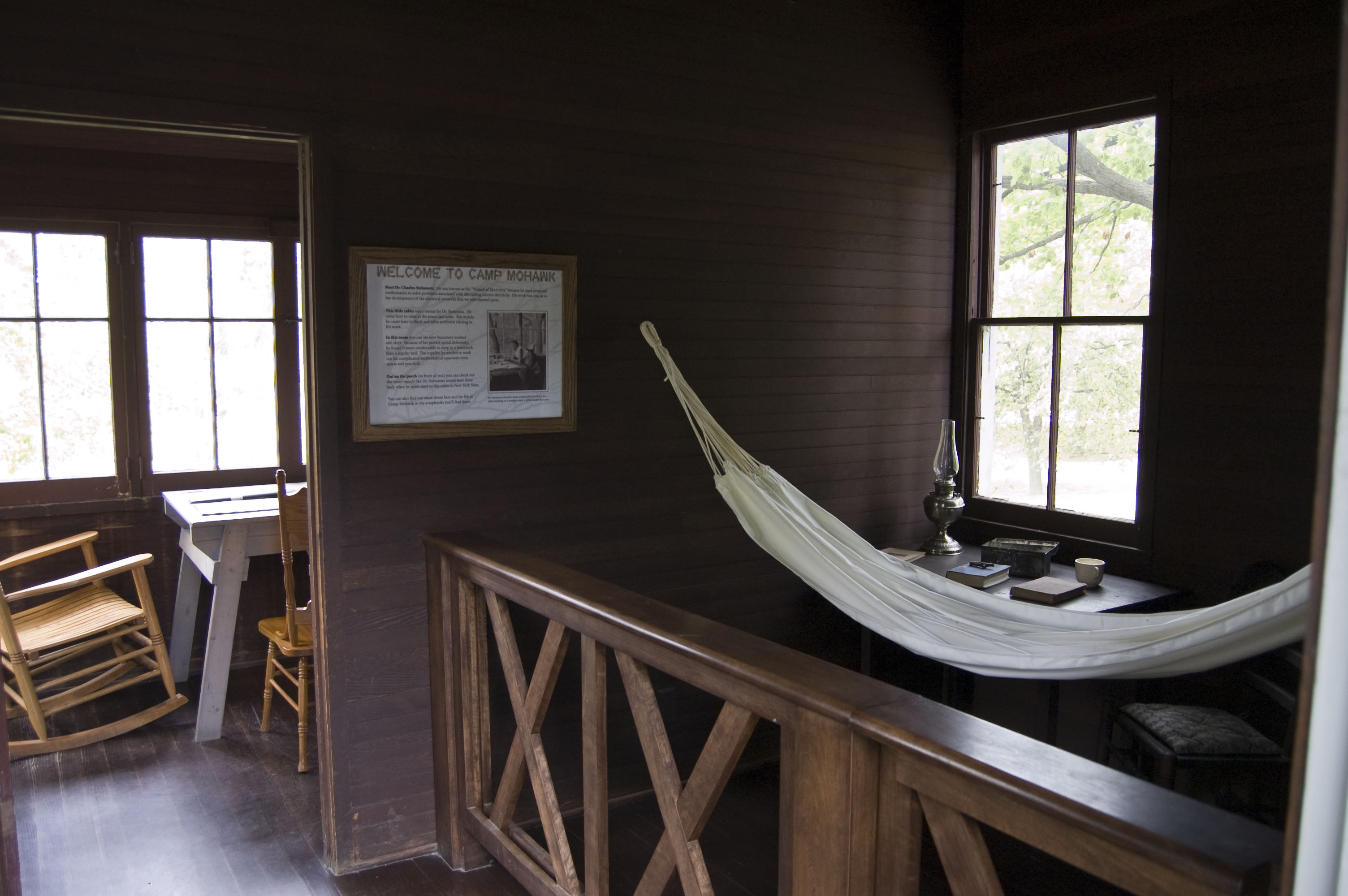
Steinmetz maintained a small cabin overlooking the Mohawk River near Schenectady, New York

A public park in north Schenectady, New York, was named for him in 1931.

In 1983, the US Post Office included Steinmetz in a series of postage stamps commemorating American inventors.

In May 2015, a life-size bronze statue of Charles Steinmetz meeting Thomas Edison by sculptor and caster Dexter Benedict was unveiled on a plaza on the corner of Erie Boulevards and South Ferry Street in Schenectady.

Charles Steinmetz's Mohawk River cabin is preserved and on display in the outdoor collection of historic structures in Greenfield Village, part of the Henry Ford Museum complex in Dearborn, Michigan.

== In popular culture ==
Steinmetz is featured in John Dos Passos's U.S.A. trilogy in one of the biographies. He also serves as a major character in Starling Lawrence's 2006 book, The Lightning Keeper. Steinmetz is a major character in the novel Electric City by Elizabeth Rosner.

In the 1944 Three Stooges short "Busy Buddies," Moe Howard references Steinmetz. Steinmetz was portrayed in 1959 by the actor Rod Steiger in the CBS television anthology series, The Joseph Cotten Show. The episode focused on his socialist activities in Germany.

A famous anecdote about Steinmetz concerns a troubleshooting consultation at Henry Ford's River Rouge Plant. A humorous aspect of the story is the "itemized bill" he submitted for the work performed.

== Bibliography ==
=== Patents ===
At the time of his death, Steinmetz held over 200 patents. Among them are:

- U.S. patent 533,244, "System of distribution by alternating current" (January 29, 1895)
- U.S. patent 559,419, "Inductor dynamo"
- U.S. patent 583,950, "Three phase induction meter"
- U.S. patent 594,145, "Inductor dynamo"
- U.S. patent 714,412, "Induction motor"
- U.S. patent 717,464, "System of electrical distribution"
- U.S. patent 865,617, "Induction motor"
- U.S. patent 1,025,932, "Means for producing light" (May 7, 1912)
- U.S. patent 1,042,986, "Induction furnace"
- U.S. patent 1,230,615, "Protective device"
- U.S. patent RE11576, "Inductor dynamo"

=== Works ===
- Steinmetz (1892). "On the Law of Hysteresis". Transactions of the American Institute of Electrical Engineers. IX (2): 3–64. doi:10.1109/T-AIEE.1892.5570437. S2CID 41139163.
- Steinmetz (1894). "Complex Quantities and Their Use in Electrical Engineering". Proceedings of the International Electrical Congress Held in the City of Chicago, August 21st to 25th, 1893. American Institute of Electrical Engineers. pp. 33–74.
- Steinmetz (1895). "Theory of the General Alternating Current Transformer". Transactions of the American Institute of Electrical Engineers. XII^{th} General Meeting: 245–256. doi:10.1109/T-AIEE.1895.4763861. S2CID 51631303.
- Steinmetz; Berg (1897). Theory and Calculation of Alternating Current Phenomena (1st ed.). New York: Electrical World and Engineer. OL 7218906M. This book's first edition was expanded and updated in many subsequent editions.
- Steinmetz (1897). "The Alternating Current Induction Motor". Transactions of the American Institute of Electrical Engineers. XIV (1): 183–217. doi:10.1109/T-AIEE.1897.5570186. S2CID 51652760.
- Steinmetz (1898). "The Natural Period of a Transmission Line and the Frequency of Lightning Discharge Therefrom" (PDF). The Electrical World. XXXII (9): 203–205. Archived (PDF) from the original on February 26, 2013.
- Steinmetz (1901). "Speed Regulation of Prime Movers and Parallel Operation of Alternators". Transactions of the American Institute of Electrical Engineers. 157th Meeting: 741–744. doi:10.1109/T-AIEE.1901.4764200. S2CID 51630424.
- Steinmetz (1902). Theoretical Elements of Electrical Engineering (2nd ed.). New York: Electrical World and Engineer.
- Steinmetz (1904). "The Alternating-Current Railway Motor". Transactions of the American Institute of Electrical Engineers. 183rd: 9–25. doi:10.1109/T-AIEE.1904.4764436. S2CID 51639034.
- Steinmetz (1907). "Lightning Phenomena in Electric Circuits". Proceedings of the American Institute of Electrical Engineers. XXVI (1): 401–423. doi:10.1109/PAIEE.1907.6742407. S2CID 51661312.
- Steinmetz (1908a). "Electrical Engineering Education". Transactions of the American Institute of Electrical Engineers. XXVII (1): 79–85. doi:10.1109/T-AIEE.1908.4768047. S2CID 51639619.
- Steinmetz (1908c). "Primary Standard of Light". Proceedings of the American Institute of Electrical Engineers. XXVII (2): 1319–1324. doi:10.1109/PAIEE.1908.6741999. S2CID 51661636.
- Steinmetz (1908d). "The General Equations of the Electric Circuit". Proceedings of the American Institute of Electrical Engineers. XXVII (2): 1231–1305. doi:10.1109/PAIEE.1908.6742132. S2CID 51630604.
- Steinmetz (1908e). Hayden (ed.). General Lectures on Electrical Engineering. Schenectady, NY: Robson & Adee.
- Steinmetz (1909a). "Prime Movers". Proceedings of the American Institute of Electrical Engineers. XXVIII (2): 63–84. doi:10.1109/PAIEE.1909.6659726. S2CID 51652876.
- Steinmetz (1909b). "The Value of the Classics in Engineering Education". Transactions of the American Institute of Electrical Engineers. XXVIII (2): 1103–1106. doi:10.1109/T-AIEE.1909.4768232. S2CID 51655383.
- Steinmetz (1909c). Hayden (ed.). Radiation, Light and Illumination : A Series of Engineering Lectures Delivered at Union College. New York: McGraw-Hill.
- Steinmetz, Charles Proteus (1910). The future of electricity. New York: New York Electrical Trade School. OCLC 8899343.
- Hayden; Steinmetz (1910). "Disruptive Strength with Transient Voltages". Proceedings of the American Institute of Electrical Engineers. XXIX (5): 1125–1158. doi:10.1109/PAIEE.1910.6659996. S2CID 51658987.
- Steinmetz (1910). "Mechanical Forces in Magnetic Fields". Proceedings of the American Institute of Electrical Engineers. XXIX (12): 367–385. doi:10.1109/PAIEE.1910.6660496. S2CID 51674164.
- Steinmetz (1911a). Engineering Mathematics; A Series of Lectures Delivered at Union College. New York: McGraw-Hill.
- Steinmetz (1911b). Elementary Lectures on Electric Discharges, Waves and Impulses, and Other Transients. New York: McGraw-Hill.
- Steinmetz (1911c). Theory and Calculation of Transient Electric Phenomena and Oscillations. New York: McGraw-Hill.
- Steinmetz (1912a). "Some Problems of High-Voltage Transmissions". Proceedings of the American Institute of Electrical Engineers. XXXI (1): 167–173. doi:10.1109/PAIEE.1912.6659629. S2CID 51646565.
- Steinmetz (1912b). "The death of energy and the second law of thermodynamics, with particular reference to the thermodynamics of the atmosphere". Proceedings of the American Institute of Electrical Engineers. XXXI (8): 419–424. doi:10.1109/PAIEE.1912.6660272.
- Steinmetz (1914a). "Instability of Electric Circuits". Proceedings of the American Institute of Electrical Engineers. XXXIII (1): 2005–2021. doi:10.1109/PAIEE.1914.6661036. S2CID 51673393.
- Steinmetz (1914b). "Recording Devices". Transactions of the American Institute of Electrical Engineers. XXXIII (1): 283–292. doi:10.1109/T-AIEE.1914.4765133. S2CID 51663159.
- Steinmetz (1916a). "Outline of Theory of Impulse Currents". Proceedings of the American Institute of Electrical Engineers. XXXV (1): 1–31. doi:10.1109/PAIEE.1916.6590573. S2CID 51643938.
- Steinmetz (1916b). America and the New Epoch. New York & London: Harper & Brothers.
- Steinmetz (1917). Theory and Calculation of Electric Apparatus. New York: McGraw-Hill.
- Steinmetz (1918a). "America's Energy Supply". Proceedings of the American Institute of Electrical Engineers. XXXVII (2): 985–1014. doi:10.1109/PAIEE.1918.6594102.
- Steinmetz (1918b). "The Oxide Film Lightning Arrester". Proceedings of the American Institute of Electrical Engineers. XXXVII (2): 871–880. doi:10.1109/PAIEE.1918.6594099. S2CID 51654897.
- Steinmetz (1919). "The General Equations of the Electric Circuit-III". Transactions of the American Institute of Electrical Engineers. XXXVIII (1): 191–260. doi:10.1109/T-AIEE.1919.4765606. S2CID 51640012.
- Steinmetz (1920). "Power Control and Stability of Electric Generating Stations". Transactions of the American Institute of Electrical Engineers. XXXIX (2): 1215–1287. doi:10.1109/T-AIEE.1920.4765322. S2CID 51646533.
- Steinmetz (1922). "Condenser Discharges Through a General Gas Circuit". Journal of the American Institute of Electrical Engineers. XLI (8): 63–76. doi:10.1109/JoAIEE.1922.6591026. S2CID 51668690.
- Hayden; Steinmetz (1923). "High-Voltage Insulation". Journal of the A.I.E.E. XLII (3): 1029–1042. doi:10.1109/JAIEE.1924.6534047. S2CID 51630818.
- Steinmetz (1923a). "Frequency Conversion by Third Class Conductor and Mechanism of the Arcing Ground and Other Cumulative Surges". Transactions of the American Institute of Electrical Engineers. XLII: 470–477. doi:10.1109/T-AIEE.1923.5060887. S2CID 51630796.
- Steinmetz (1923b). Four Lectures on Relativity and Space. New York: McGraw-Hill.
- Steinmetz (1923c). "Cable Charge and Discharge". Transactions of the American Institute of Electrical Engineers (XLII): 577–592. doi:10.1109/T-AIEE.1923.5060899. S2CID 51649225.
- Steinmetz (1924). "Overdamped Condenser Oscillations". Journal of the A.I.E.E. XLIII (5): 126–130. doi:10.1109/JAIEE.1924.6534780. S2CID 51668440.

== See also ==
- Charles P. Steinmetz Academic Centre
- IEEE Charles Proteus Steinmetz Award
- de:Steinmetzschaltung (Steinmetz circuit)(in German)

== General sources ==
- Alger, P.L.; Arnold, R.E. (1976). "The History of Induction Motors in America". Proceedings of the IEEE. 64 (9): 1380–1383. doi:10.1109/PROC.1976.10329. S2CID 42191157.
- Broderick, John Thomas (1924). Steinmetz and His Discoveries. Robson & Adee.
- Caldecott, Ernest; Alger, Philip Langdon (1965). Steinmetz the Philosopher. Schenectady, NY: Mohawk Development Service.
- "Charles Proteus Steinmetz". IEEE Engineering Management Review. 44 (2). IEEE: 7–9. 2016. doi:10.1109/EMR.2016.2568678.
- Garlin, Sender (1977). "Charles Steinmetz: Scientist and Socialist (1865–1923): Including the Complete Steinmetz-Lenin Correspondence". Three Radicals. New York: American Institute for Marxist Studies.
- Gilbert, James B. (Winter 1974). "Collectivism and Charles Steinmetz". Business History Review. 48 (4): 520–540. doi:10.2307/3113539. JSTOR 3113539. S2CID 145106936.
- Goodrich, Arthur (June 1904). "Charles P. Steinmetz, Electrician". The World's Work. Vol. 8. pp. 4867–4869.
- Hammond, John Winthrop (1924). Charles Proteus Steinmetz: A Biography. New York: The Century & Co.
- Hart, Larry (1978). Steinmetz in Schenectady: A Picture History of Three Memorable Decades. Old Dorp Books.
- Kline, Ronald R. (1992). Steinmetz: Engineer and Socialist. Baltimore, MD: Johns Hopkins University Press.
- Kline, Ronald (2014). "Steinmetz, Charles". In Slotten, Hugh Richard (ed.). The Oxford Encyclopedia of the History of American Science, Medicine, and Technology. Oxford University Press. ISBN 978-0199766666.
- Knowlton, A. E. (1949). Standard Electrical of Electrical Engineers. McGraw-Hill. "ch. 2-Electric & Magnetic Circuits, ch. 4- Properties of Materials, ch. 7 - AC Generators & Motors"
- Lavine, Sigmund A. (1955). Steinmetz, Maker of Lightning. Dodd, Mead & Co.
- Leonard, Jonathan Norton (1929). Loki: The Life of Charles Proteus Steinmetz. New York: Doubleday.
- Miller, Floyd (1962). The Electrical Genius of Liberty Hall: Charles Proteus Steinmetz. New York: McGraw-Hill.
- Miller, John Anderson; Steinmetz, Charles Proteus (1958). Modern Jupiter: The Story of Charles Proteus Steinmetz. American Society of Mechanical Engineers.
- Remscheid, Emil J.; Charves, Virginia Remscheid (1977). Recollections of Steinmetz: A Visit to the Workshops of Dr. Charles Proteus Steinmetz. General Electric Company, Research and Development.
- Whitehead, John B. Jr. (1901). "Book Review: Alternating Current Phenomena" (PDF). Bulletin of the American Mathematical Society. 7 (9): 399–408. doi:10.1090/S0002-9904-1901-00825-7. Archived (PDF) from the original on May 8, 2015.
