= Harold G. Moulton =

American economist (1883–1965)

Harold Glenn Moulton (November 7, 1883, Le Roy, Michigan – December 14, 1965, Charles Town, West Virginia) was an American economist and longtime fellow at the Brookings Institution. He authored several dozen books and papers exploring timely social and economic topics, including "Waterways versus Railways" (1912), "The Principles of Money and Banking" (1916), "Germany's Capacity to Pay" (1923), "The Reparation Question" (1924), "The Formation of Capital" (1935), "Control of Germany and Japan" (1944), and "Can Inflation be Controlled?" (1958).

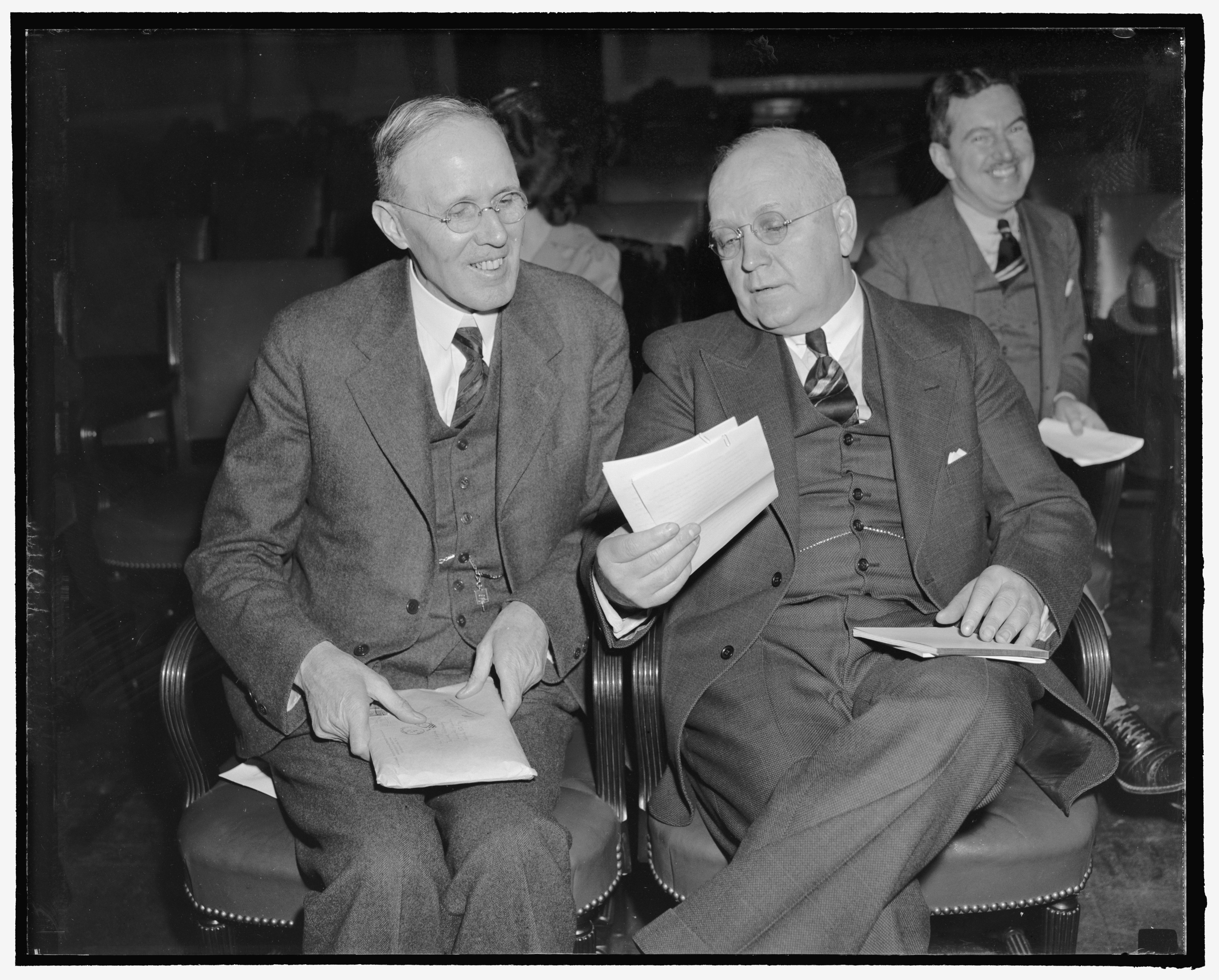

Before joining Brookings Moulton was on the faculty of the economics department of the University of Chicago, where he served also as debate team coach.

Moulton was elected to the American Academy of Arts and Sciences in 1932. In 1937 he was recognized by being invited to deliver the prestigious Charles P. Steinmetz Memorial Lecture at Union College. He was elected to the American Philosophical Society the following year.

He was the brother of Forest Ray Moulton, a noted astronomer.

Non-profit organization positions
Preceded by Robert S. Brookings as Founder	President of the Brookings Institution; 1927–1952	Succeeded by Robert Calkins
