= Erik Hallén =

Swedish physicist and engineer (1899–1975)

Erik Gustaf Hallén
- Hallén in 1957
- Born: 16 September 1899; Gothenburg, Sweden
- Died: 7 February 1975 (aged 75); Sweden
- Education: Chalmers University of Technology; Uppsala University
- Known for: Hallén's integral equation
- Awards: Cedergren Medal (1954)
- Scientific career
- Fields: Physics; Electrical engineering
- Workplaces: KTH Royal Institute of Technology
- Thesis: Über die elektrischen Schwingungen in drahtförmigen Leitern (1930)
- Doctoral advisor: Carl Wilhelm Oseen

Erik Gustaf Hallén (16 September 1899 – 7 February 1975) was a Swedish physicist and electrical engineer who was a Professor of Electromagnetic Theory at KTH Royal Institute of Technology. Known for his contributions to antenna theory, he introduced an integral equation for cylindrical antennas in 1938, known as Hallén's integral equation.

Born on 16 September 1899 in Gothenburg, Hallén received Master of Science in Engineering from Chalmers University of Technology in 1921. He conducted his doctoral studies under Carl Wilhelm Oseen at Uppsala University, receiving his PhD in 1930 with a thesis titled, "Über die elektrischen Schwingungen in drahtförmigen Leitern." In 1945, he was appointed as Professor of Electromagnetic Theory at the KTH Royal Institute of Technology. During his career at KTH, he has also held visiting professorships at Harvard University and California Institute of Technology, and authored the monographs Electromagnetic Theory and Forced Oscillations and Operator Calculus.

Hallén was the recipient of Cedergren Medal (1954), as well as an honorary doctorate from Chalmers University of Technology. He was also a member of Royal Swedish Academy of Sciences and Swedish National Committee of International Union of Radio Science.

Hallén married to Lila Richardson in 1955. He died on 7 February 1975.

== Selected publications ==
Books

- Hallén, Erik (1962). Electromagnetic Theory. New York: John & Wiley Sons.
- Hallén, Erik (1965). Tvungna Svängningar och Operatorkalkyl. Uppsala: Almqvist & Wiksell.

Journal articles

- Hallén, Erik (1926). "Über die gequantelte Bewegung eines zweiatomigen Moleküls im Kramersschen Molekülmodell". Zeitschrift für Physik (in German). 35 (8–9): 642–65. Bibcode:1926ZPhy...35..642H. doi:10.1007/BF01379811.
- Hallén, Erik (1934). "XV. Overtones and fundamental period of an electric oscillatory circuit". The London, Edinburgh, and Dublin Philosophical Magazine and Journal of Science. 17 (7): 192–197. doi:10.1080/14786443409462380.
- Hallén, Erik (1936). "Elastische Schwingungen, die sich von einem zeitlich und räumlich begrenzten Oberflächenspannungsgebiet in einen isotropen homogenen elastischen Halbraum ausbreiten". Zeitschrift für Angewandte Mathematik und Mechanik (in German). 16 (1): 5–19. Bibcode:1936ZaMM...16....5H. doi:10.1002/zamm.19360160103.
- Hallén, Erik (1937). "Ladungsverteilung auf einem Zylinder zwischen zwei leitenden Ebenen verschiedenen Potentials". Annalen der Physik (in German). 421 (2): 117–128. Bibcode:1937AnP...421..117H. doi:10.1002/andp.19374210203.
- Hallén, E. (1938). "Theoretical investigations into the transmitting and receiving qualities of antennae". Nova Acta Upsal. 4 (11): 1–44.
- Hallén, Erik (August 1938). "Über das Eindringen von Wanderwellen in Wicklungen". Archiv für Elektrotechnik (in German). 32 (8): 515–537. doi:10.1007/BF01656640.
- Hallén, Erik (1948). "Properties of a long antenna". Journal of Applied Physics. 19 (12): 1140–1147. Bibcode:1948JAP....19.1140H. doi:10.1063/1.1715034.
- Hallen, E. (July 1956). "Exact treatment of antenna current wave reflection at the end of a tube-shaped cylindrical antenna". IRE Transactions on Antennas and Propagation. 4 (3): 479–491. Bibcode:1956ITAP....4..479H. doi:10.1109/TAP.1956.1144401.
