= Edward C. Welsh =

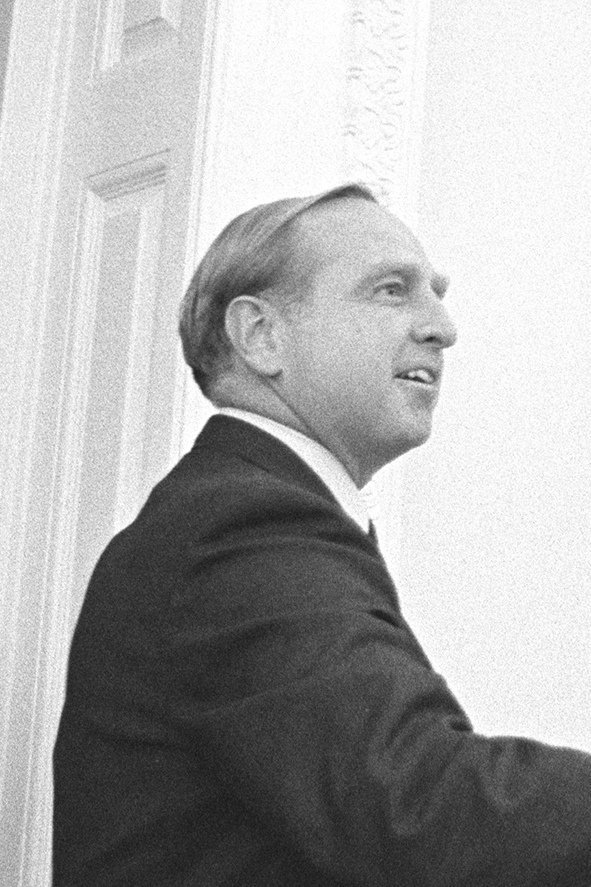

Executive Secretary of the National Aeronautics and Space Council
- In office 1961–1969
- Preceded by: Inaugural holder

Personal details
- Born: Edward Cristy Welsh; March 20, 1909 Long Valley, New Jersey
- Died: March 25, 1990 (aged 81) Silver Spring, Maryland
- Education: Lafayette College; Tufts University; Ohio State University
- Occupation: Administrator; economist

Edward C. Welsh (March 20, 1909 – March 25, 1990) was an official of the United States federal government, best known for serving as the Executive Secretary to the National Aeronautics and Space Council (NASC) during the John F. Kennedy presidential administration.

Prior to his appointment he had served as an adviser to Kennedy's Democratic rival in the presidential campaign Senator Stuart Symington on space-related issues. Following Symington's elimination in the party primary, JFK's advisers borrowed space and defense-related content Welsh had developed for Symington in order to fend off an aggressive stance by the Republican candidate Richard M. Nixon. An important instance appeared under Kennedy's name in the October 10, 1961, edition of Cold War-era important trade publication Missiles and Rockets magazine. It included the stirring charge:

"We are in a strategic space race with the Russians, and we are losing....Control of space will be decided in the next decade. If the Soviets control space they can control earth, as in centuries past the nation that controlled the seas dominated the continents...We cannot run second in this vital race. To insure peace and freedom we must be first."

This shortly morphed in Kennedy's advisers' hands into his infamous "Missile Gap" speech of October 18, 1960, wherein the then United States senator exaggeratedly claimed the Soviet Union was far ahead of the U.S. in developing missiles with nuclear warheads rather than the U.S. holding a distinct superiority.

Shortly into his tenure as head of NASA Welsh drafted an amendment to the 1961 Space Act at Kennedy's behest that made the vice president instead of the president chairman of the National Space Council. Lyndon B. Johnson then assumed an important role in the long and difficult task of finding someone willing to serve as NASA administrator in an environment of uncertainty and ambiguity. Johnson immediately spearheaded the effort that recommended a lunar landing and return as the best way to beat the Soviets in space, resulting in the forging of the strong relationship with that agency he maintained throughout his presidency.

Secure in office Kennedy began to backtrack on his hawkish campaign rhetoric on expanding the role of defense in space, while embracing the civilian space exploration program and its lunar ambitions. Indicating this shift regarding the militarization of space, Kennedy strongly insisted in a May 1961 memorandum to Welsh, then still his top space administrator, that the president be advised beforehand of any effort to launch any systems involving nuclear power into space.

Welsh left his role in the Executive prior to Johnson commencing his elected term as president in January 1964. In 1967 he was recognized by being invited to deliver prestigious Charles P. Steinmetz Memorial Lecture at Union College.
