= Mandy Vaughn =

American aeronautical engineer

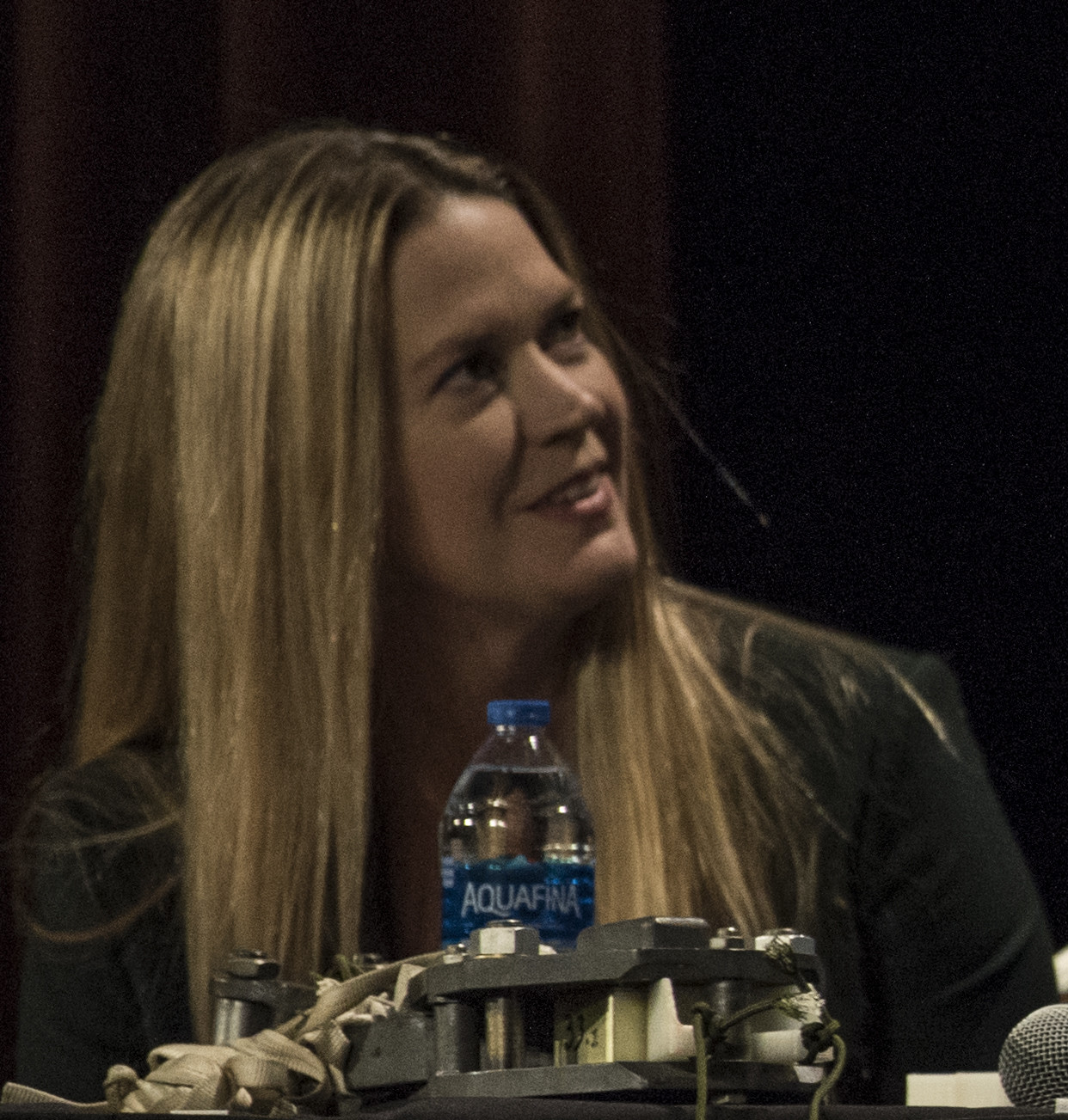
- Vaughn at the 2018 Air Mobility Command Phoenix Spark Tank competition
- Education: Massachusetts Institute of Technology
- Employer(s): Virgin Orbit Virgin Galactic United States Air Force

Mandy Vaughn (née Chambers) is an American aeronautical engineer. She was President of Virgin Orbit's sister company, VOX space.

== Early life and education ==
Vaughn began flying aged 11 and earned her pilots license aged 18. She studied mechanical engineering at Massachusetts Institute of Technology (MIT). She stayed at MIT for her graduate studies and earned a master's degree in Aeronautics and Astronautics in 2002. At MIT, Vaughn went through the Reserve Officers Training Course (ROTC). Whilst at MIT Vaughn relaunched the skydiving club, and has since completed more than 700 sky dives.

== Career ==
In 2000 Vaughn joined the United States Air Force. She joined Hill Air Force Base as a developmental engineer in the intercontinental ballistic missiles system program office in 2002. From 2004 she worked at the Los Angeles Air Force Base in the Space Superiority Systems Directorate. Vaughn worked with the General Dynamics Mission Systems Space and Intelligence directorate, where was responsible for space control and investment portfolios.

In 2015 Vaughn joined Virgin Orbit as Senior Director of Business Development. She created the business program for LauncherOne for commercial and government clients. Vaughn is a member of the National Space Council's User Advisory Group. She was appointed director of VOX Space in 2017. In November 2017 the first Defence Department agency account was announced. VOX Space focus on servicing government contracts for Virgin Orbit. Vaughn has climbed Kilimanjaro and Aconcagua.
