= Reinhold Rudenberg =

German born American electrical engineer (1893–1961)

- Education: Leibniz University Hannover
- Awards: Elliott Cresson Medal (1961)

Reinhold Rudenberg (or Rüdenberg) was a German-American electrical engineer and inventor, credited with many innovations in the electric power and related fields. Aside from improvements in electric power equipment, especially large alternating current generators, among others were the electrostatic-lens electron microscope, carrier-current communications on power lines, a form of phased array radar, an explanation of power blackouts, preferred number series, and the number prefix "Giga-".

== Early life and education ==
Reinhold Rudenberg was born in Hannover to a family of Jewish descent. His father Georg was a manufacturer, who operated a plant for preparing, cleaning feathers and down goods. His mother was a daughter of the Chief Rabbi of the county of Braunschweig. He attended the Leibniz University Hannover (then Technische Hochschule), and after receiving his electrical engineering degrees (Dipl. Ing.) and doctorate (Dr. Ing.), both in 1906, he worked for Professor Ludwig Prandtl as a teaching assistant at the Institute for Applied Physics and Mechanics at Göttingen University. There he also attended courses in physics and the celebrated Advanced Electrodynamics course by Emil Wiechert, who only ten years earlier had been one of the discoverers of the electron.

In 1919 Rudenberg married Lily Minkowski, daughter of the Göttingen mathematician Hermann Minkowski and Auguste née Adler. The physicist H. Gunther Rudenberg was the son of Reinhold and Lily Rudenberg.

== Work and research ==
Rudenberg taught at Göttingen, Berlin, London, and in the U.S. at MIT and Harvard University. At Harvard he was head of the Department of Electrical Engineering at the Graduate School of Engineering from 1939 to 1952, when he retired.

After leaving Göttingen in 1908 he started at the manufacturer of electrical machinery Siemens-Schuckertwerke (SSW), part of the Siemens group of companies, in Berlin. He entered as a machine design engineer, and quickly advanced to head this department. His work soon broadened to include transmission lines, distribution systems, and protective relays and switches. In 1923 he was appointed Director of the Scientific Department (Wissenschaftliche Abteilung) of SSW responsible for the research on and development of machinery and systems for the firm. Simultaneously he was named Chief Electrical Engineer (Chef-Elektriker) of the firm.

In 1916, Rudenberg designed the electric generator for the main power station in Cologne, then the largest known.

He had a keen and agile mind, published much and became a prolific inventor. His books, especially on electrical transients, were widely read and used as college texts. Among his contributions were:

- Carrier current communications (patent)
- Hollow conductors for overhead high voltage power transmission
- Electron microscope with electrostatic lenses (patent)
- Reversing or Backing of Ships and Propellers
- Phased array radar "geoscope" (patent)
- First analysis of explosives blast overpressure versus energy of charge
- Hyperbolic field lenses for focusing electron beams
- Electric power directly from atomic radiation (patent)
- Explaining the contributing cause of electric power systems blackout

== Electron microscope and patents ==
In 1930, just after returning home from a summer vacation on the Dutch seaside, his 2 3/4-year-old son became ill with leg paralysis. This was soon diagnosed as poliomyelitis, which at that time was a frightening disease with a death rate of 10–25% as the disease progressed to the lungs. Polio was then known to be caused by a virus, too small to be visible under an optical microscope. From that time Rudenberg was determined to find or invent a way to make such a small virus particle visible. He thought that electrons, because of their subatomic size, as he had learned in Göttingen from Wiechert, would be able to resolve such small virus particles, and he investigated ways to focus these to create their enlarged image.

Already in 1927 Hans Busch, his friend since Göttingen, had published an analysis of a magnetic coil acting as a lens. Rudenberg reasoned that an electron beam leaving a point on an object in an axially symmetric electrostatic system could be focused back to an image point if the radial electric field was proportional to the electron distance from the axis. Thus he believed that real magnified images could be obtained under these conditions. As the date of a public lecture on electron optics was approaching Siemens applied for a patent on Rudenberg's electrostatic-lens instrument and his general electron microscope principles on May 30, 1931. Siemens also obtained patents in six other countries. In Germany this, or patents derived therefrom, were granted at various later times from 1938 to 1954. Some competitors voiced complaints against the Rudenberg patents, but ignored or did not notice the earlier year that Rudenberg began his invention (1930) nor the difference of the stimulus that initiated it, nor would they recognize the technical differences between his electrostatic electron lenses and the magnetic lenses used by others.

== Honors ==
- 1911 – Montefiori Prize, Institut Montefiore, Liège, Belgium
- 1921 – Dr.Ing. h.c. T.U. Karlsruhe
- 1946 – Stevens Institute Honor Award and Medal "For notable achievement in the Field of Electron Optics as the inventor of the electron microscope."
- 1949 – Cedergren Medal, Sweden
- 1954 – Eta Kappa Nu Eminent Member
- 1956 – TU Berlin Honorary Senator
- 1957 – Grand Cross of Meritorious Service of the Federal German Republic, Germany's GVK medal "Pour le Merite" (Große Verdienstkreuz des Verdienstordens der Bundesrepublik)
- 1961 – Elliott Cresson Medal, Franklin Institute, Philadelphia

== Works ==
- Rüdenberg, Reinhold (1916) Artilleristische Monatshefte, No. 113/114, 237–265, 285–316 (in which Rudenberg analyzes the mechanism and the propagation of shock waves from heavy explosions and determines the laws of destruction at a distance).
- Rüdenberg, R. (1932) Elektronenmikroskop (Electron microscope). Naturwissenschaften 20, 522
- Rüdenberg, Reinhold (1943) The frequencies of natural power oscillations in interconnected generating and distribution systems. Trans. Amer. Inst. Elec. Engineers 62, 791–803 (In which Rudenberg shows the fundamental period of power surge and sag after a major transient, that may trigger a total blackout).
- Rüdenberg, Reinhold (1943) "The Early History of the Electron Microscope", J Appl. Physics 14, 434–436, (in which Rudenberg describes stimulus to begin his work, also patent excerpts showing his electrostatic aperture electron lenses).
- Rüdenberg, Reinhold (1945) J. Franklin Inst. 240, p. 193ff & 347ff (in which Rudenberg investigates the reversal and the transient behaviour of propellers and ships during maneuvering for controlled rapid action and the prevention of loss of control from propeller "cavitation").
