= Cedergren Medal =

The Cedergren Medal is a rarely granted honor awarded to outstanding scientists in electrical engineering by the Cedergren Foundation. Only 14 have been issued since the recognition was created in 1914. Mathematics genius and electrical engineering pioneer Charles P. Steinmetz was the first recipient of the honor's silver medal.

The award is administered on behalf of the foundation by the KTH - Royal Institute of Technology, one of Europe's leading technical and engineering universities.

In addition to funding the honor, the foundation, which was established in 1909, also uses its endowment fund's investment returns for scholarships to Swedish electro technicians. Namesake Henrik Tore Cedergren (1853-1909) was the founder of Stockholms Allmänna Telefon AB which merged with Lars Magnus Ericsson’s company in 1918 to become Allmänna Telefonaktiebolaget L M Ericsson. Today, Ericsson is the world’s largest mobile communication network provider, holding 35% market share.

== Partial list of recipients ==
- Charles P. Steinmetz, #1 (1914)
- Ernst Alexanderson, (1944)
- Reinhold Rudenberg, (1950)
- Erik Hallén, (1954)
- John Robinson Pierce, (1964)
- Hannes Alfvén, (1988)
- Björn Ottersten, #12 (2014)
- Lennart Ljung, (2019)
