= Hollis Caswell =

American educator

- Born: October 22, 1901; Woodruff, Kansas, U.S.
- Died: November 22, 1988 (aged 87); Santa Barbara, California, U.S.
- Occupation: Educator

Hollis Leland Caswell (October 22, 1901 – November 22, 1988) was an American educator who became an authority on curriculum planning in schools. He directed surveys of curriculum practices in several school systems, and wrote several books on the subject.

Caswell joined the editorial advisory board of the World Book Encyclopedia in 1936, and became its chairman in 1948. In 1954, Caswell was appointed president of Teachers College, Columbia University in New York City, and served as its president until 1962.

From 1962 until 1966 Caswell served as general chairman of editorial advisory boards for Field Enterprises Educational Corporation.

Following his retirement as president at Teachers College, Caswell continued at the College, being appointed to the Marshall Field, Jr., Professorship of Education. He remained in that chair until 1967.

== Early life and education ==
Caswell was a descendant of Kansas homesteaders. He attended a rural high school in western Kansas and attended Kansas State University for two years before transferring to the University of Nebraska, where he received a bachelor's degree in 1922.

Planning to go to law school, he took a temporary job teaching at the high school in Auburn, Nebraska. After he was appointed principal at the age of 21, he gave up his ambition to become a lawyer and devoted his full energies to teaching. After two years in Auburn, he was named superintendent of schools in Syracuse, Nebraska. In 1926 he enrolled in Teachers College, Columbia University, earning a master's degree the following year and a doctorate in 1929.

== Career in education ==
In 1929, after receiving his Ph.D., Caswell joined the faculty of George Peabody College in Nashville, Tennessee; now affiliated with Vanderbilt University, and rose to become a full professor before he returned to Teachers College nine years later to head its department of curriculum and teaching and to direct its division of instruction. He launched several studies of educational systems during this time, publishing his findings ("City School Surveys: An Interpretation and Appraisal" (1929); "Education in Middle School" (1942); "Program-Making in Small Elementary Schools" (1942); "American High School: Its Responsibility and Opportunity" (1946)). Caswell was a leader in the development of state courses of study in the 1930s, consulting on state curriculum programs in Alabama, Florida, Virginia, Mississippi, Arkansas, Tennessee, and Kansas.

== President of Teachers College ==
Caswell served as president of Teachers College from 1954 until 1962. During his presidency the college launched a twenty-year collaboration with schools in Afghanistan, and mounted a volunteer program for teachers to various nations in Africa (the college instituted the Teachers for East Africa program during his tenure). After leaving the presidency, Caswell served until 1967 as the College's Marshall Field Jr. professor of education.

== Education reform ==
In the years after World War II, Dr. Caswell opposed efforts to develop a standard national curriculum for public schools, arguing instead for more differentiation in teaching methods. He called for strengthening university centers that influence curricula and teacher training. He was frequently outspoken on educational subjects and did not shun controversy. The provocative subject of his 1952 address as the annual installment of the Charles P. Steinmetz Memorial Lecture series was "The Great Reappraisal of Public Education". In 1958, in a speech at a conference in Albany, he welcomed citizen interest in schools but opposed participation by people who were not educators in planning curricula:

What should be taught in American history should not be left up to historians and not to citizens' committees.

Caswell also disputed campaigns to do away with some of the so-called frills in education, contending, for example, that driver training was worthwhile because it cut accidents and that the draft in World War II showed the nation that physical education was not a frill either.

In the two decades before his retirement Caswell was a principal editorial adviser to World Book Encyclopedia, published by Field Enterprises. He also was a consultant to many state education departments and municipal school systems and held a number of high positions in national educational organizations, including the National Education Association and the American Council on Education.
