= National Space Council =

Presidential advisory body focused on US space policy

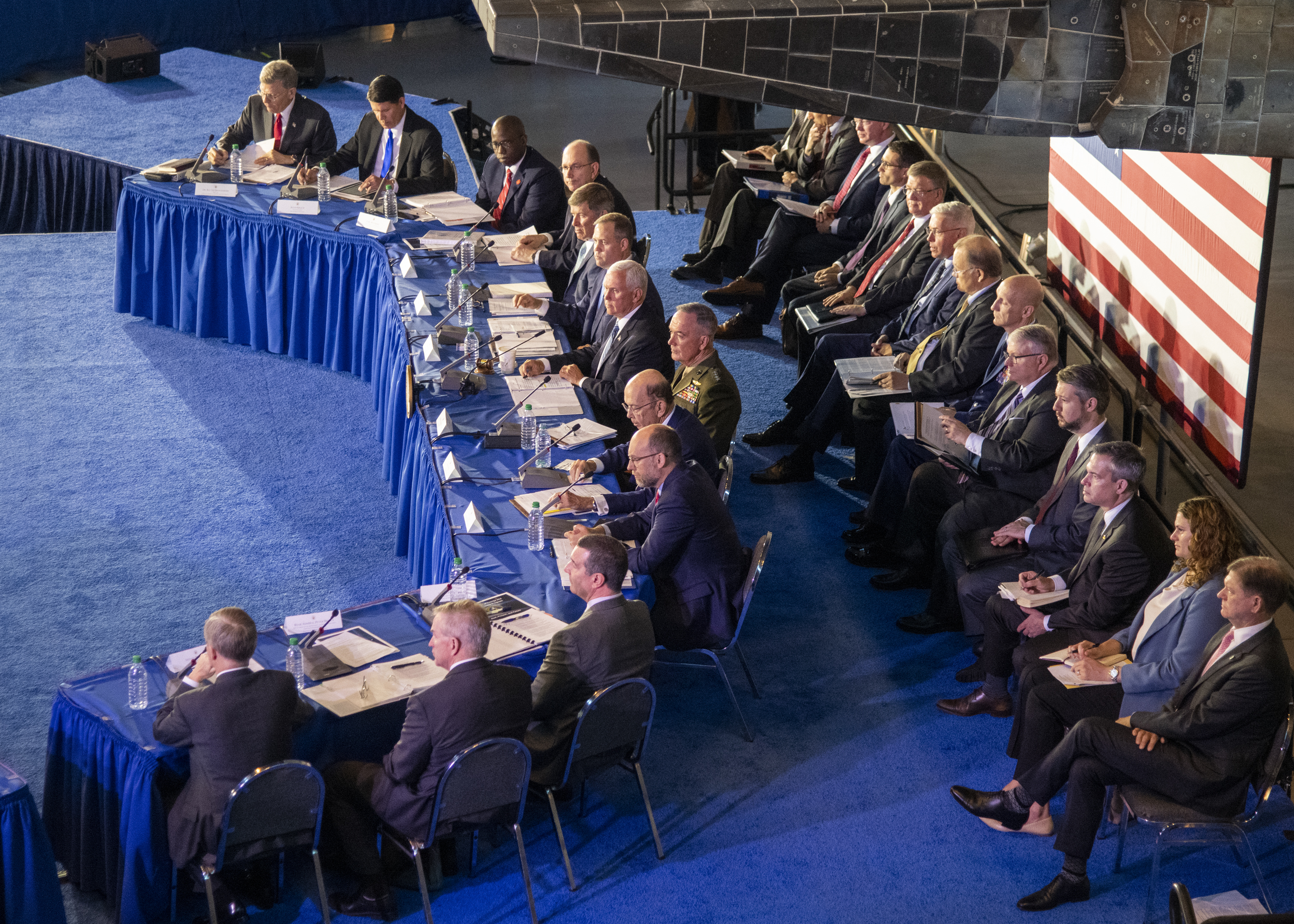
National Space Council meeting in 2019, at the Steven F. Udvar-Hazy Center in Chantilly, VA

The National Space Council was a body within the Executive Office of the President of the United States created in 1989 during the George H. W. Bush administration, disbanded in 1993, and reestablished in June 2017 by the Donald Trump administration. It was disbanded once more in December 2025 by the Trump Administration. It was a modified version of the earlier National Aeronautics and Space Council (1958–1973).

The National Space Council operated as an office of policy development and handles a portfolio of civil, commercial, national security, and international space policy matters. Composed of cabinet-level members and supported by a Users Advisory Group, the council was chaired by the vice president of the United States.

== National Aeronautics and Space Council (NASC) ==
=== 1958–1973 ===
Established by the National Aeronautics and Space Act of 1958, the NASC was chaired by the President of the United States (then Dwight Eisenhower). Other members included the Secretaries of State and Defense, the NASA Administrator, the Chairman of the Atomic Energy Commission, plus up to four additional members (one from the federal government and up to three from the private industry) chosen at the President's discretion.

The council was allowed to employ a staff to be headed by a civilian executive secretary. Eisenhower did not use the NASC extensively during the remainder of his term, and recommended at the end of his last year in office that it be abolished. He did not fill the post of executive secretary but named an acting secretary on loan from NASA. Shortly before assuming office, then President-elect John F. Kennedy announced that he wanted his vice president, Lyndon Johnson, to become chairman of the NASC, requiring an amendment to the Space Act.

Edward C. Welsh was the first executive secretary of the NASC, appointed in 1961 by President John F. Kennedy. Welsh, who as a legislative aide to Senator Stuart Symington (D-Missouri) helped draft the 1958 legislation that created NASA and the NASC, spent the 1960s as the principal advisor to the White House on space issues. He also assisted in the development of the legislation that created the Communications Satellite Corporation (COMSAT). After his retirement in 1969, he remained active as an advisor to NASA.

The NASC was abolished in 1973 by a reorganization of the Executive Office of the President. President Richard Nixon decided that, because "basic policy issues in the United States space effort have been resolved, and the necessary interagency relationships have been established", the NASC was no longer needed.

== National Space Council ==
=== 1989–1993 ===
George H. W. Bush created the National Space Council by Executive Order 12675. The council was chaired by Vice President Dan Quayle and included the following members:

- The Secretary of State
- The Secretary of the Treasury
- The Secretary of Defense
- The Secretary of Commerce
- The Secretary of Transportation
- The Director of the Office of Management and Budget
- The Chief of Staff to the President
- The Assistant to the President for National Security Affairs
- The Assistant to the President for Science and Technology
- The Director of the Central Intelligence Agency
- The Administrator of the National Aeronautics and Space Administration

=== Disbanding ===
On February 12, 1992, friction between the largely astronaut-based management at NASA and the National Space Council led to Richard Truly, then NASA Administrator and a former astronaut, being removed from the council. Truly was forced out after Vice President Quayle and the space council's executive director, Mark J. Albrecht, enlisted the aid of Samuel K. Skinner, the White House chief of staff, in urging Pres. Bush to remove Truly. Quayle and the council staff made the move because they felt Truly would impede a new plan to restructure and streamline many aspects of the space program, including the space agency administration.

In 1993, the Space Council was disbanded and its functions absorbed by the National Science and Technology Council.

In August 2008, when campaigning for president, Barack Obama promised to re-establish the National Aeronautics and Space Council. However, he completed two terms as president without having done so.

In December 2025, President Trump signed Executive Order 14369, disbanding the Space Council once more. Its functions transferred to the White House Office of Science and Technology Policy.

=== 2017 revival ===
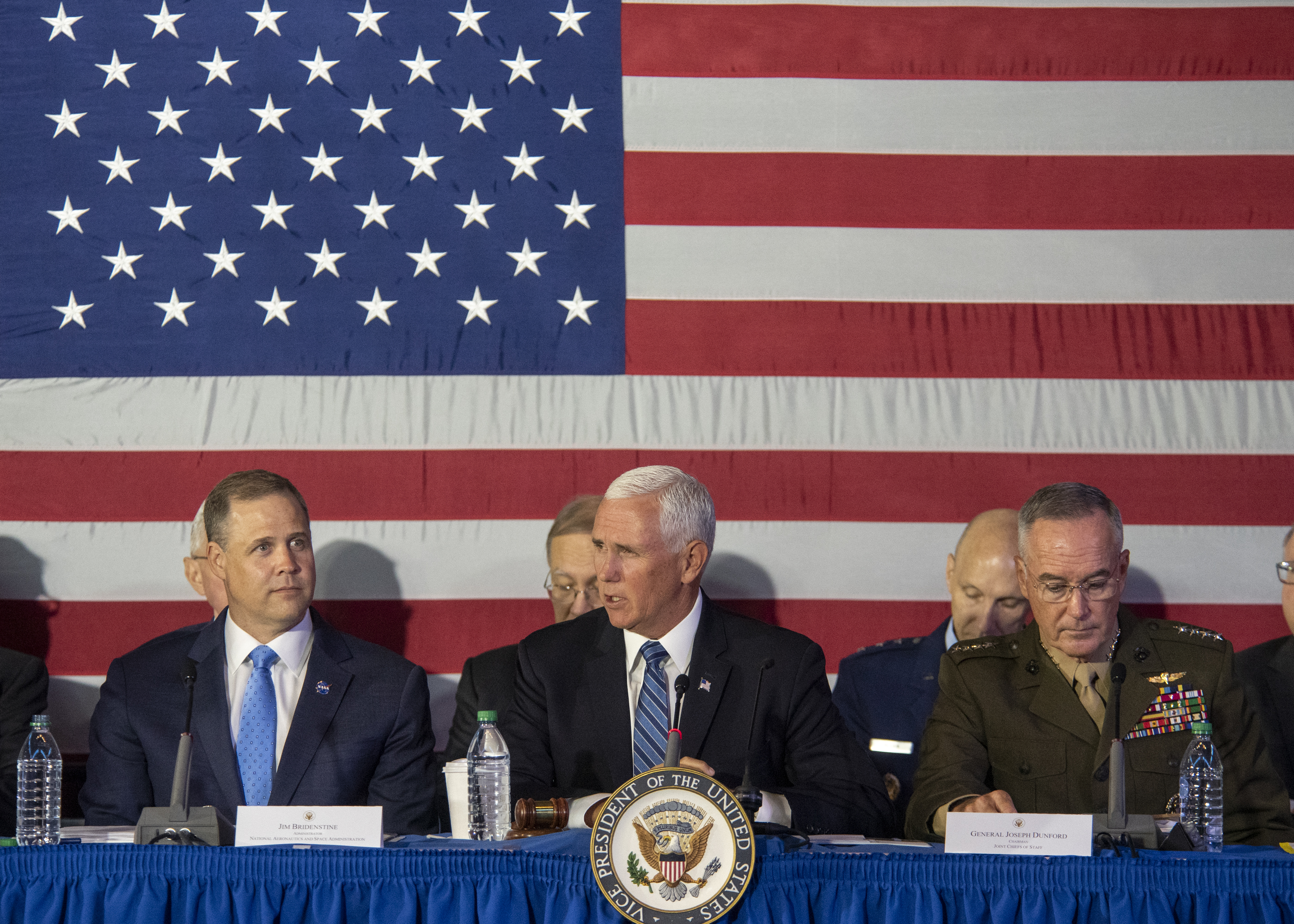
Pence (center) speaks at the sixth meeting of the revived council in 2019

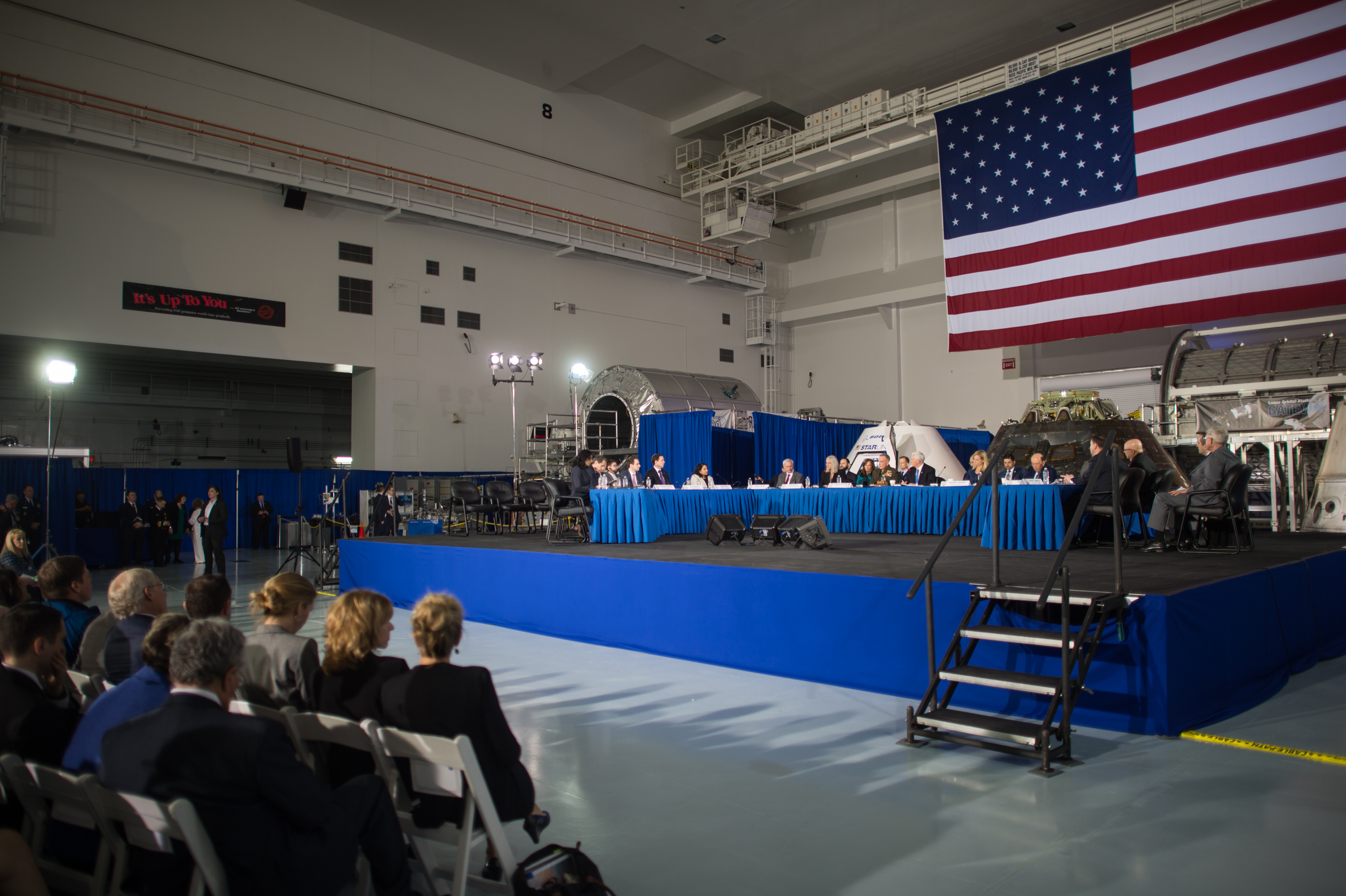
The second meeting took place in the high bay of the Space Station Processing Facility at KSC, Feb 2019.

In October 2016, Robert Smith Walker and Peter Navarro, two senior policy advisers to GOP presidential candidate Donald Trump, wrote in an op-ed in SpaceNews that if elected, Trump would reinstitute a national space policy council headed by the vice president. In the first year of the Trump administration, Vice President Mike Pence indicated that the space council would be re-established, and would have a significant involvement in the direction of America's activities in space. On June 30, 2017, President Trump signed an executive order for such a reestablishment. The revival of the National Space Council and the drafting of the executive order was led by Trump's senior advisor Peter J. White. Following its re-institution, the council met for the first time on October 5, 2017, at the Smithsonian National Air and Space Museum's Steven F. Udvar-Hazy Center and Space Museum in Chantilly, Virginia. On December 9, 2020, the 8th and last meeting of the White House National Space Council under the leadership of then Vice President Mike Pence took place at Kennedy Space Center (KSC), FL. Major announcements were a new National Space Policy and the naming of 18 NASA astronauts on the Artemis Team. The executive secretary of the National Space Council was Scott Pace during the Trump Administration.

List of meetings of the Revived National Space Council chaired by then Vice President Mike Pence:

- 1st meeting took place on October 5, 2017, at the Steven F. Udvar-Hazy Center in Chantilly, Virginia.
- 2nd meeting took place on February 21, 2018, at the Space Station Processing Facility, Cape Canaveral, Florida.
- 3rd meeting took place on June 18, 2018, at the White House, Washington, D.C.
- 4th meeting took place on October 23, 2018, at the National War College, Washington, D.C.
- 5th meeting took place on March 27, 2019, at the U.S. Space and Rocket Center in Huntsville, Alabama.
- 6th meeting took place on August 20, 2019, at the Steven F. Udvar-Hazy Center, Chantilly, Virginia.
- 7th meeting took place on May 19, 2020, at NASA Headquarters in Washington, D.C., and by video conference. Due to the COVID-19 pandemic the meeting was postponed from March 24, 2020.
- 8th meeting took place on December 9, 2020, at the Apollo/Saturn V Center at Kennedy Space Center Visitor Complex. As the pandemic eased off in the area, the meeting resumed its normal desk arrangement and audience (with the exception of facemasks). This meeting was to finalize the space policy for the Artemis program in the years ahead.

The revived National Space Council consisted of the following members:

- Vice President of the United States, chair
- Secretary of State
- Secretary of Defense
- Secretary of Commerce
- Secretary of Transportation
- Secretary of Energy (since February 2020)
- Secretary of Homeland Security
- Director of National Intelligence
- Director of the Office of Management and Budget
- National Security Advisor
- Assistant to the President for Economic Policy (since February 2020)
- Assistant to the President for Domestic Policy (since February 2020)
- Administrator of the National Aeronautics and Space Administration
- Director of the Office of Science and Technology Policy
- Homeland Security Advisor (until February 2020)
- Chairman of the Joint Chiefs of Staff

=== National Space Council Users Advisory Group ===
On February 20, 2018, Vice President Mike Pence, Chairman of the National Space Council announced the candidates selected to serve on the National Space Council Users Advisory Group. Pending official appointment by the Administrator of the National Aeronautics and Space Administration, the selected members of the Users Advisory Group worked to fulfill President Trump's mandate to "foster close coordination, cooperation, and technology and information exchange" across the nation's space enterprise. The announcement was made on the eve of the second meeting of the National Space Council. "Moon, Mars, and Worlds Beyond: Winning the Next Frontier" includes testimonials from leaders in the civil, commercial, and national security sectors about the importance of the United States' space enterprise. NSC UAG consists of six subcommittees. Details are at nasa.gov With detailed reports of meetings at FederalRegister.gov. and the most recent meeting agenda booklet

Selection to the National Space Council Users Advisory Group:

- Buzz Aldrin, Gemini 12 and Apollo 11 astronaut
- Tory Bruno, President and CEO of United Launch Alliance
- Wes Bush, CEO of Northrop Grumman
- Dean Cheng, Senior Research Fellow, Asian Studies Center, Davis Institute for National Security and Foreign Policy of The Heritage Foundation
- Eileen Collins, 4-time Space Shuttle astronaut, first female Space Shuttle commander
- Steve Crisafulli, Former Speaker of the Florida House of Representatives
- Mary Lynne Dittmar, President and CEO of the Coalition for Deep Space Exploration
- James O. Ellis, Retired United States Navy Admiral, former head of STRATCOM, and member of the Space Foundation Board of Directors
- Tim Ellis, former CEO of Relativity Space
- Newt Gingrich, former Speaker of the United States House of Representatives
- Marillyn Hewson, CEO of Lockheed Martin
- Homer Hickam, Author of Rocket Boys and former NASA Marshall Spaceflight Center engineer
- Kay Ivey, Governor of Alabama
- Fred Klipsch, Founder and Chairman of Hoosiers for Quality Education
- Lester Lyles, Retired United States Air Force General and member of the NASA Advisory Council
- Pam Melroy, 3-time Space Shuttle astronaut and former deputy director of the Tactical Technology Office at the Defense Advanced Research Projects Agency
- Dennis Muilenburg, CEO of the Boeing Company
- Fatih Ozmen, CEO of the Sierra Nevada Corporation
- G. P. "Bud" Peterson, President of the Georgia Institute of Technology
- Harrison "Jack" Schmitt, Apollo 17 astronaut and former Senator
- Gwynne Shotwell, President and COO of SpaceX
- Bob Smith, CEO of Blue Origin
- Eric Stallmer, President of the Commercial Spaceflight Federation
- David Thompson, founder and CEO of Orbital ATK
- Pamela Vaughan, Board Certified Science Teacher
- Mandy Vaughn, President, VOX Space
- Stuart O. Witt, Former CEO of Mojave Air and Space Port, former Navy pilot, Chairman Emeritus of the Commercial Spaceflight Federation
- David Wolf, 4-time Space Shuttle astronaut and physician
- Pete Worden, Former Air Force General and NASA Ames Research Center Director

=== National Space Council Fifth Meeting Summary ===
The fifth meeting of the National Space Council was held on March 26, 2019, where Chairman Vice President Mike Pence announced that U.S. astronauts would return to the surface of the Moon by March 26, 2024. Reports from NASA Administrator Jim Bridenstine and other council members were received and reviewed during the meeting. The Vice President also stated that NASA would be directed to ensure that the first woman and next man on the Moon will both be American astronauts from American soil, and that the Trump Administration and the American people are committed to achieving that goal at the Marshall Space Flight Center, located in Huntsville, Alabama. He emphasized that the National Space Council would be aiming to get to the Moon's South Pole, which holds great "scientific, economic, and strategic value".

Afterward, there were two expert panels on human space exploration and council discussion, respectively.

Panel 1: Ready to Fly, was led by:

- Les Lyles, Retired U.S. Air Force general and former Vice Chief of Staff of the Air Force
- Eileen Collins former U.S. Air Force officer and NASA Astronaut
- Sandy Magnus, former NASA Astronaut

Panel 2: Ready to Explore, was led by:

- Dan Dumbacher, executive director of the American Institute of Aeronautics and Astronautics
- Jack Burns, Director and Principal Investigator of the Network for Exploration and Space Science and a professor at the University of Colorado, Boulder
- Wanda Sigur, current aerospace consultant and former vice president and General Manager of the Civil Space business at Lockheed Martin Space Systems

=== Biden administration ===
On 29 March 2021 a spokesperson for the National Security Council announced that the National Space Council would continue under the Biden administration. In the statement the spokesperson said, "At a time of unprecedented activity and opportunity generated by America’s activities in space, the National Space Council will be renewed to assist the President in generating national space policies, strategies, and synchronizing America’s space activities." While the makeup of the council has yet to be finalized the spokesperson stated "While we are still working details, we will tailor the Council to ensure we have representation that can address the priorities of the Administration — such as space-related science and technologies, space exploration, solutions to address climate change, ensuring economic and educational opportunities, building partnerships, cementing norms of behaviors in space, and addressing matters of national security efforts in space."

It was also announced that the council's User Advisory Group would continue. On April 29, 2021, NASA Administrator Bill Nelson announced Vice President Kamala Harris was appointed chairman of the council. Vice President Harris later appointed Chirag Parikh as executive secretary of the National Space Council, on August 2, 2021.

List of meetings of the Revived National Space Council chaired by Vice President Kamala Harris:

- 1st meeting took place on December 1, 2021, at the U.S. Institute of Peace in Washington, D.C. The meeting convened by United States Senator Mark Kelly from Arizona introducing Vice President Harris before she gave remarks about space policy and her priorities for the National Space Council on behalf of the White House. NASA Administrator Bill Nelson gave opening statements and provided a brief history of NASA to the council. Video: V.P. Harris Convenes First National Space Council Meeting

On August 12, 2022, Introduction by Sala Ba. Vice President Harris presented a briefing on supporting the Commercial Space Sector. Harris announced the second meeting of the National Space Council at the Chabot Space and Science Center in Oakland, California. The meeting took place on September 9, 2022. Video: Transcript:

- 2nd meeting took place on September 9, 2022
- 3rd meeting took place on December 20, 2023. Introduction by Canadian Space Agency astronaut and Artemis 2 crew member Jeremy Hansen at the Mellon Auditorium in Washington DC. V.P. Kamala Harris Chairs National Space Council Meeting in Washington (Official NASA Stream).

A new User Advisory Group was appointed in December 2022. It was chaired by Lester Lyles.

- General (USAF, Ret) Lester Lyles, UAG Chair
- Mr. Rajeev Badyal, VP of Technology, Amazon Project Kuiper
- Mr. Charles Bolden, Former NASA Administrator and Former Astronaut
- Mr. Salvatore T. Bruno, CEO, United Launch Alliance
- Dr. Lance Bush, President & CEO, Challenger Center
- Ms. Bridget Chatman, chairwoman, Women in Aerospace
- Mr. Theodore "Ted" Colbert, CEO, Boeing Defense, Space & Security
- Ms. Nancy Colleton, President, Institute for Global Environmental Strategies
- Ms. Karina Drees, President, Commercial Spaceflight Federation
- Mr. Eric Fanning, President and CEO, Aerospace Industries Association
- Dr. Daniel Hastings, Head, Department of Aeronautics & Astronautics, Massachusetts Institute of Technology
- Ms. Dawne Hickton, Subject Matter Expert
- Mr. Daniel Jablonsky, President & CEO, Maxar Technologies
- Dr. Dave Kaufman, President, Ball Aerospace
- Mr. Patrick Lin, Director of the Ethics & Emerging Sciences Program, California Polytechnic State University
- Mr. Ron Lopez, President & Managing Director, Astroscale US
- Dr. Harold Lee Martin, Chancellor of North Carolina Agricultural & Technical State University
- Dr. Kate Marvel, Climate Scientist at Project Drawdown
- Maj Gen (Ret) Roosevelt "Ted" Mercer, CEO & Director, Virginia Space
- Dr. Marla Perez-Davis, former director, NASA Glenn Research Center
- Dr. Sian Proctor, Geoscience Professor, South Mountain Community College
- Ms. Gwynne Shotwell, President & COO, SpaceX
- Dr. Robert Smith, CEO, Blue Origin
- Mr. James Taiclet, President & CEO, Lockheed Martin
- Dr. Mandy Vaughn, Subject Matter Expert
- Ms. Kathy Warden, Chairwoman & CEO, Northrop Grumman Corp
- Mr. Robbie Schingler Jr., Co-founder & Chief Strategy Officer, Planet Labs
- Ms. Melanie Stricklan, Co-founder & CEO, Slingshot Aerospace
- Dr. Jeremy Williams, Head, Climate Corporation & Digital Farming, Bayer Crop Science
- Ms. Katrina Harden Williams, Middle School Teacher, Ames Middle School, Iowa
