= Steinmetz's equation =

Power loss in magnetic materials

Steinmetz's equation, sometimes called the power equation, is an empirical equation used to calculate the total power loss (core losses) per unit volume in magnetic materials when subjected to external sinusoidally varying magnetic flux. The equation is named after Charles Steinmetz, a Prussian-American electrical engineer, who proposed a similar equation without the frequency dependency in 1890. The equation is:

$$P_v = k \cdot f^a \cdot B^b$$

where $P_v$ is the time average power loss per unit volume in mW per cubic centimeter, $f$ is frequency in kilohertz, and $B$ is the peak magnetic flux density; $k$, $a$, and $b$, called the Steinmetz coefficients, are material parameters generally found empirically from the material's B-H hysteresis curve by curve fitting. In typical magnetic materials, the Steinmetz coefficients all vary with temperature.

The energy loss, called core loss, is due mainly to two effects: magnetic hysteresis and, in conductive materials, eddy currents, which consume energy from the source of the magnetic field, dissipating it as waste heat in the magnetic material. The equation is used mainly to calculate core losses in ferromagnetic magnetic cores used in electric motors, generators, transformers and inductors excited by sinusoidal current. Core losses are an economically important source of inefficiency in alternating current (AC) electric power grids and appliances.

If only hysteresis is taken into account (à la Steinmetz), the coefficient $a$ will be close to 1 and $b$ will be 2 for nearly all modern magnetic materials. However, due to other nonlinearities, $a$ is usually between 1 and 2, and $b$ is between 2 and 3. The equation is a simplified form that only applies when the magnetic field $B$ has a sinusoidal waveform and does not take into account factors such as DC offset. However, because most electronics expose materials to non-sinusoidal flux waveforms, various improvements to the equation have been made. An improved Steinmetz equation, often referred to as iGSE, can be expressed as

$$P = \frac{1}{T} \int_0^T k_i {\left|\frac{dB}{dt}\right|}^a (\Delta B^{b-a}) dt$$

where $\Delta B$ is the flux density from peak to peak, and $k_i$ is defined by

$$k_i = \frac{k}{{(2 \pi)}^{a-1} \int_0^{2 \pi} {2^{b-a} \left| \cos \theta \right|}^a d \theta}
= \frac{k \cdot \Gamma \left ( \frac{a}{2} + 1 \right )}{2^b {\pi}^{a - \frac{1}{2}} \cdot \Gamma \left ( \frac{a + 1}{2} \right )}$$

where $a$, $b$ and $k$ are the same parameters used in the original equation and Γ is the gamma function. This equation can calculate losses with any flux waveform using only the parameters needed for the original equation, but it ignores the fact that the parameters, and therefore the losses, can vary under DC bias conditions. DC bias cannot be neglected without severely affecting results, but there is still not a practical physically-based model that takes both dynamic and nonlinear effects into account. However, this equation is still widely used because most other models require parameters that are not usually given by manufacturers and that engineers are not likely to take the time and resources to measure.

The Steinmetz coefficients for magnetic materials may be available from the manufacturers. However, manufacturers of magnetic materials intended for high-power applications usually provide graphs that plot specific core loss (watts per volume or watts per weight) at a given temperature against peak flux density $B_{pk}$, with frequency as a parameter. Families of curves for different temperatures may also be given. These graphs apply to the case where the flux density excursion is ±$B_{pk}$. In cases where the magnetizing field has a DC offset or is unidirectional (i.e. ranges between zero and a peak value), core losses can be much lower but are rarely covered by published data.

== See also ==
- Core losses
- Eddy currents
- Legg's equation
- Magnetic hysteresis
