= List of Mississippi State University people =

The following is a list of notable people associated with Mississippi State University, located in the American city of Starkville, Mississippi.

== Notable alumni ==
=== Politics and government ===
- Sharion Aycock, first female federal district court judge in Mississippi
- Donnie Bell, Mississippi state representative
- Andy Berry, Mississippi state senator
- Marsha Blackburn, U.S. senator from Tennessee
- C. Scott Bounds, Mississippi state representative
- Andy Boyd, Mississippi state representative
- Nicole Akins Boyd, Mississippi state senator
- Randy Boyd, forester who serves as a Republican in the Mississippi House of Representatives for District 19 in his native Itawamba County
- Jenifer Branning, Republican member of the Mississippi State Senate
- Hob Bryan, Mississippi state senator
- Kimberly L. Campbell, Mississippi state representative
- Videt Carmichael, Republican member of the Mississippi State Senate
- Cynthia Cooper, whistleblower, 2002 Time Person of the Year
- Sam Creekmore IV, Mississippi state representative
- Leonard B. Cresswell, major general in the Marine Corps; World War II Navy Cross recipient
- Jess Dickinson, Mississippi Supreme Court justice
- Charles D. Easley, Mississippi Supreme Court justice
- Jeremy England, Mississippi state senator
- Robert Evans, Mississippi state representative
- Josh Harkins, Republican member of the Mississippi State Senate
- Horace Harned, former member of the Mississippi House of Representatives
- Doc Harris, Mississippi state representative
- Bill Hawks, former USDA undersecretary, Marketing and Regulatory Programs
- Joey Hood, Mississippi state representative
- Mac Huddleston, former Mississippi state representative
- Todd Jordan, mayor of Tupelo, Mississippi
- Kabir Karriem, Mississippi state representative
- Mark Keenum, USDA undersecretary, Farm and Foreign Agricultural Service
- Rhonda Keenum, assistant to President George W. Bush and director of White House Public Liaison
- Brad Mattox, Mississippi state representative
- Billy McCoy, speaker of the Mississippi House of Representatives
- Troy H. Middleton, World War II corps commander (lieutenant general) and president of Louisiana State University
- Tom Miles, former Mississippi state representative
- G.V. "Sonny" Montgomery, former U.S. representative and author of the Montgomery G.I. Bill
- Philip Moran, Mississippi state senator
- Bill Pigott, Mississippi state representative
- Brent Powell, Mississippi state representative
- Brandon Presley, former Democratic Public Service commissioner for Mississippi's northern district
- Brian Rhodes, Mississippi state senator
- Rob Roberson, Mississippi state representative
- Fred Shanks, Mississippi state representative
- Cecil L. Simmons, speaker pro tempore of the Mississippi House of Representatives
- John C. Stennis, former U.S. senator; "father of the Modern Navy"
- Jody Steverson, Mississippi state representative
- Benjamin Suber, Mississippi state senator
- Amy Tuck, Mississippi lieutenant governor
- Angela Turner-Ford, Mississippi state senator
- William Waller Jr., Mississippi Supreme Court justice
- Albert H. Wilkening, adjutant general of Wisconsin
- Bart Williams, Mississippi state senator
- Charles Young Jr., Mississippi state representative
- Charles Younger, Mississippi state senator

=== Academia ===
- James E. Cofer, Fulbright Scholar and former president of Missouri State University in Springfield, Missouri, and former president of the University of Louisiana at Monroe
- Frances Lucas, vice president and campus executive officer of the University of Southern Mississippi-Gulf Coast
- Damir Novosel, Fulbright Scholar, founder and president of Quanta Technology in Raleigh, North Carolina, former vice president of ABB Automation Products, and former president of IEEE Power & Energy Society
- Malcolm Portera, former chancellor of the University of Alabama System
- Charles Sallis, historian and history professor of Millsaps College
- Priscilla Slade, former president of Texas Southern University

=== Business ===
- Richard Adkerson, CEO of Freeport-McMoRan Copper & Gold Inc.
- George W. Bryan, senior vice president of Sara Lee Corporation, CEO of Sara Lee Foods, and founder of Old Waverly Golf Club
- Toxey Haas, founder and CEO of Haas Outdoors, Inc. (Mossy Oak)
- Martin F. Jue, amateur radio inventor; entrepreneur; founder of MFJ Enterprises
- Hartley Peavey, founder of Peavey Electronics
- Dalton Pritchard, early color television systems pioneer at RCA Laboratories
- Arthur L. Williams, Jr., insurance magnate, #583 on Forbes' list of the world's billionaires

=== Media and arts ===
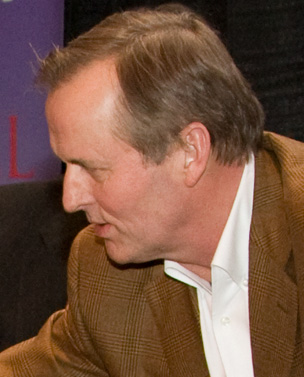
Author John Grisham

- Kevin Benson, meteorologist for WPXI in Pittsburgh
- Turner Catledge, former vice president of The New York Times
- Jerry Clower, comedian
- Bill Evans, meteorologist for WABC-TV, ABC affiliate in New York City
- John Grisham, author of more than two dozen novels, many of which have been made into screenplays
- Matthew F. Jones, novelist
- Gregory Keyes, author
- Donna Ladd, journalist
- Sean McLaughlin, MSNBC Chief Meteorologist
- Lewis Nordan, author
- Audrey Puente, New York City meteorologist; daughter of salsa singer Tito Puente
- Frank K. Spain, founder of Tupelo television station WTVA; broadcasting pioneer
- Joe M. Turner, magician, mentalist, professional speaker
- Brad Watson (born 1955), author

=== Athletics ===
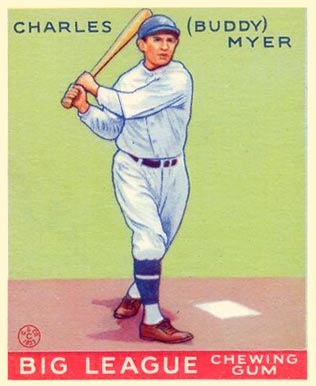
All-Star Buddy Myer

- Jim Ashmore, former NBA player
- Denico Autry, DE, Oakland Raiders
- Vick Ballard, NFL running back, Indianapolis Colts
- Johnthan Banks, cornerback for the Tampa Bay Buccaneers
- Korey Banks, CFL DB BC Lions
- Kevin Bouie, NFL player
- Timmy Bowers, professional basketball player, 2006 Israeli Basketball Premier League MVP
- Jimmy Bragan, former MLB coach with Cincinnati, Montreal, and Milwaukee 1967–1977
- Jeff Brantley, former Major League Baseball relief pitcher; commentator for the Cincinnati Reds
- Rickey Brown, C for Golden State, Atlanta Hawks
- Titus Brown, NFL defensive end, Cleveland Browns
- Shawn Byrdsong, football player
- Van Chancellor, former head coach of women's basketball at Louisiana State University, at the University of Mississippi, and of the Houston Comets of the WNBA
- Ed Chapman, P for the Washington Senators in 1933
- Bubba Church, pitcher for the Phillies, Reds, and Cubs from 1950 to 1955
- Will Clark, former first baseman for San Francisco Giants, Baltimore Orioles, St. Louis Cardinals, and Texas Rangers
- John Cohen, Mississippi State University head coach; athletic director of Auburn University
- Keo Coleman, former NFL linebacker
- Michael Connell (born 1975), PGA golfer 2001–2006
- Johnie Cooks, NFL linebacker, Super Bowl XXV Champion
- Fletcher Cox, defensive tackle for the Philadelphia Eagles of the National Football League
- Hughie Critz, second baseman for Cincinnati Reds (1920s) and the New York Giants (1930s)
- Quinton Culberson, NFL linebacker, St. Louis Rams
- Erick Dampier, former NBA player
- Charlie Davidson, football player
- Art Davis, NFL player, college football coach
- Brandon Davis (born 1990), professional mixed martial artist competing in the UFC
- Harper Davis, NFL player, college football head coach
- Anthony Dixon, NFL running back, San Francisco 49ers
- Kevin Dockery, NFL Super Bowl XLII Champion
- Dominic Douglas, NFL linebacker, Denver Broncos
- Frank Dowsing, first black football player at MSU
- Eric Dubose, P for Baltimore and Cleveland 2002–2006
- Sammy Ellis, former Major League Baseball pitcher, 7 seasons
- Bobby Etheridge, former MLB player
- Rags Faircloth, P for Phillies in 1919
- Dave "Boo" Ferriss, former Major League Baseball player
- Ronald Fields, NFL DT, Denver Broncos
- Joe Fortunato, five-time Pro Bowler with the Chicago Bears
- Steve Freeman, former Buffalo Bills defensive back for 13 seasons; NFL game official
- Willie Gay (born 1998), NFL linebacker, Kansas City Chiefs
- Chuck Gelatka, NFL player
- Matt Ginter, pitcher for the Houston Astros
- De'Mon Glanton, football player
- Tom Goode, former NFL center and Super Bowl veteran
- Alex Grammas, former Major League infielder
- Hoyle Granger, former NFL running back
- Paul Gregory, pitcher in Major League Baseball, played 1932–1933 for the Chicago White Sox
- Justin Griffith, NFL running back, Oakland Raiders
- Michael Haddix, former NFL running back
- Mario Haggan, NFL linebacker, Denver Broncos
- Tang Hamilton, Miami Heat
- Claudell Harris Jr. (born 2002), basketball player in the Israeli Basketball Premier League
- Walt Harris, NFL cornerback, San Francisco 49ers
- Bunny Hearn, former MLB player; college coach
- Ron Hill, vice president of the NFL
- John Hilliard, NFL player
- Jim Howarth, Major League Baseball outfielder; played all or part of four seasons in the majors, 1971–1974, for the San Francisco Giants
- Bailey Howell, NBA Hall of Famer
- Kent Hull, former NFL C, Buffalo Bills
- Kirby Jackson, NFL DB Buffalo Bills
- Rickea Jackson (born 2001), WNBA small forward, Los Angeles Sparks
- Justin Jenkins, NFL wide receiver, Buffalo Bills
- Morley Jennings, former head football coach of the Baylor Bears; former Athletic Director of the Texas Tech Red Raiders
- Alan Johnson, Colorado Rockies
- Chris Jones, NFL defensive tackle, Kansas City Chiefs
- Chris Jones, American player of Canadian football
- Dontae' Jones, Celtics
- James Jones, NFL running back, Dallas Cowboys
- Todd Jordan, football player
- Tommy Kelly, NFL defensive end, Oakland Raiders
- Tyrone Keys, NFL linebacker, Super Bowl XX Champion
- Jon Knott, former Major League Baseball outfielder with the Padres and Orioles
- Jack Lazorko, pitcher for the Milwaukee Brewers, Seattle Mariners, Detroit Tigers and California Angels
- Donald Lee, NFL tight end, Green Bay Packers; Super Bowl XLV Champion
- D. D. Lewis, former All-Star linebacker Dallas Cowboys; member of the College Football Hall of Fame
- Carlton Loewer, retired Major League Baseball player
- Lance Long, NFL wide receiver, Arizona Cardinals
- Kyle Love, Retired NFL Defensive Tackle formerly with the Carolina Panthers. Went to Super Bowl 46 and Super Bowl 50
- Jim Lyle, pitcher for the Washington Senators (now the Minnesota Twins) in 1925
- Paul Maholm, LHP Atlanta Braves; formerly with Pittsburgh Pirates, Chicago Cubs
- Jeff Malone, two-time All-Star as a player; coached three teams in NBA D-League
- Chris Maloney, Memphis Redbirds manager (St. Louis Cardinals AAA)
- James H. "Babe" McCarthy, college and professional basketball coach
- Fred McCrary, NFL running back
- Alvin McKinley, NFL defensive end, Denver Broncos
- Bo McKinnis, sports agent
- Pernell McPhee, linebacker, Chicago Bears; formerly with Baltimore Ravens
- Brandon McRae, NFL wide receiver, St. Louis Rams
- Brandon Medders, MLB player
- John Miller, NFL linebacker, Green Bay Packers
- Leland Mitchell, New Orleans Buccaneers of the ABA
- Monroe Mitchell, Washington Senators
- Willie Mitchell, Cleveland Naps/Indians and Detroit Tigers
- Henry Monroe, NFL DB Green Bay Packers
- Mitch Moreland, first baseman, Boston Red Sox
- Eric Moulds, NFL wide receiver, Buffalo Bills
- Arnett Moultrie, Philadelphia 76ers
- Buddy Myer, Major League Baseball, two-time All-Star second baseman
- Bob Myrick, LHP for the New York Mets
- Tom Neville, former NFL offensive tackle, 14 seasons
- Malik Newman (born 1997), basketball player in the Israeli Basketball Premier League
- Jerious Norwood, NFL running back for the Atlanta Falcons
- Romero Osby (born 1990), American basketball player for Maccabi Kiryat Gat of the Israeli Basketball Premier League
- Walter Packer, NFL player
- Rafael Palmeiro, former Major League Baseball player
- Jonathan Papelbon, RHP Boston Red Sox and Philadelphia Phillies; All-Star in 2006, 2007, 2008, and 2009
- Jackie Parker, former All-Star quarterback CFL; member of the College Football Hall of Fame
- Wiley Peck, Spurs, Mavericks
- Adam Piatt, played for the Oakland Athletics and Tampa Bay Devil Rays
- Jay Powell, former Major League Baseball relief pitcher, 11 seasons; World Series veteran
- Dak Prescott, NFL quarterback, Dallas Cowboys
- Gary Rath, Dodgers, Twins
- Fred Reid, CFL running back, Winnipeg Blue Bombers
- Lawrence Roberts, Memphis Grizzlies
- Ray Roberts, played for the Philadelphia Athletics
- DelJuan Robinson, NFL defensive tackle, Houston Texans
- Jon Shave, former player for the Texas Rangers and the Minnesota Twins
- Buck Showalter, former baseball manager
- Renardo Sidney, former NBA player
- Jeffery Simmons, NFL defensive tackle, Chicago Bears
- Barrin Simpson, NFL linebacker
- Deontae Skinner, NFL player
- Darius Slay, cornerback for the Detroit Lions
- Don Smith, quarterback/running back for Buccaneers, Bills, and Dolphins
- Truett Smith, football player
- Fred Smoot, former NFL cornerback
- Homer Spragins, former MLB player
- David Stewart, NFL OT Tennessee Titans
- Scott Stricklin, former athletic director for Mississippi State Bulldogs, athletic director for Florida Gators
- Walter Suggs, former All-Star lineman for Houston Oilers
- Montez Sweat, NFL linebacker, Chicago Bears
- Craig Tatum, former MLB player
- Ken Tatum, former MLB player
- Bobby Thigpen, former Major League Baseball relief pitcher
- Del Unser, former Major League Baseball outfielder
- Jarvis Varnado, Miami Heat
- Victoria Vivians, WNBA Guard Indiana Fever
- Fred Walters, catcher for the Boston Red Sox in 1945
- Kendell Watkins, NFL tight end, Dallas Cowboys
- Quinndary Weatherspoon, NBA shooting guard, Golden State Warriors
- Jimmy Webb, former NFL defensive lineman, 7 seasons
- Jordan Westburg, MLB All-Star infielder, Baltimore Orioles
- Floyd Womack, NFL OT, Seattle Seahawks
- Sid Womack, former MLB player
- Marc Woodard, NFL linebacker, Philadelphia Eagles
- Ellis Wyms, NFL LT, Super Bowl Champion with the Buccaneers, Oakland Raiders
- Chris Young, pitching coach for the Philadelphia Phillies of Major League Baseball
- Pete Young, former MLB player
- Derrick Zimmerman, New Jersey Nets

=== Other ===
- Muhammad "Moe" Dakhlalla, pleaded guilty to offenses related to attempts to join ISIS in Syria
- Machine Gun Kelly, notorious criminal; studied agriculture at MSU for two years
- Patricia Walton Shelby, 32nd president general of the Daughters of the American Revolution
- Jaelyn Young, pleaded guilty to offenses related to attempts to join ISIS in Syria

== Notable faculty ==
- Roger Lee King, engineer and fellow at the IEEE
- Anthony Sean Neal, author and philosophy professor at MSU
- Roy V. Scott, historian
- Horace M. Trent, physicist who taught at MSU in the 1930s
- Allison W. Pearson, management scientist and professor emeritus
