= King Roger =

King Roger may refer to:

== People ==
- Roger II of Sicily (r. 1130–1154), first king of Sicily
- Roger III of Sicily (r. 1192–1193), co-ruler with his father King Tancred
- Roger Federer (born 1981), Swiss tennis player, nicknamed "King Roger"

== Fictional characters ==
- King Roger, a fictional character, the King of England, from the 1983 Poul Anderson novella Quest

== Other uses ==
- King Roger (opera), a 3-act oepra by Karol Szymanowski about Roger II of Sicily

== See also ==
- The Spirit King (Roger Romaine), a DC Comics supervillain
- All pages containing "King" and "Roger"
- Roger King (disambiguation)
- Roger (disambiguation)
