= Sonny Gray =

American baseball player (born 1989)

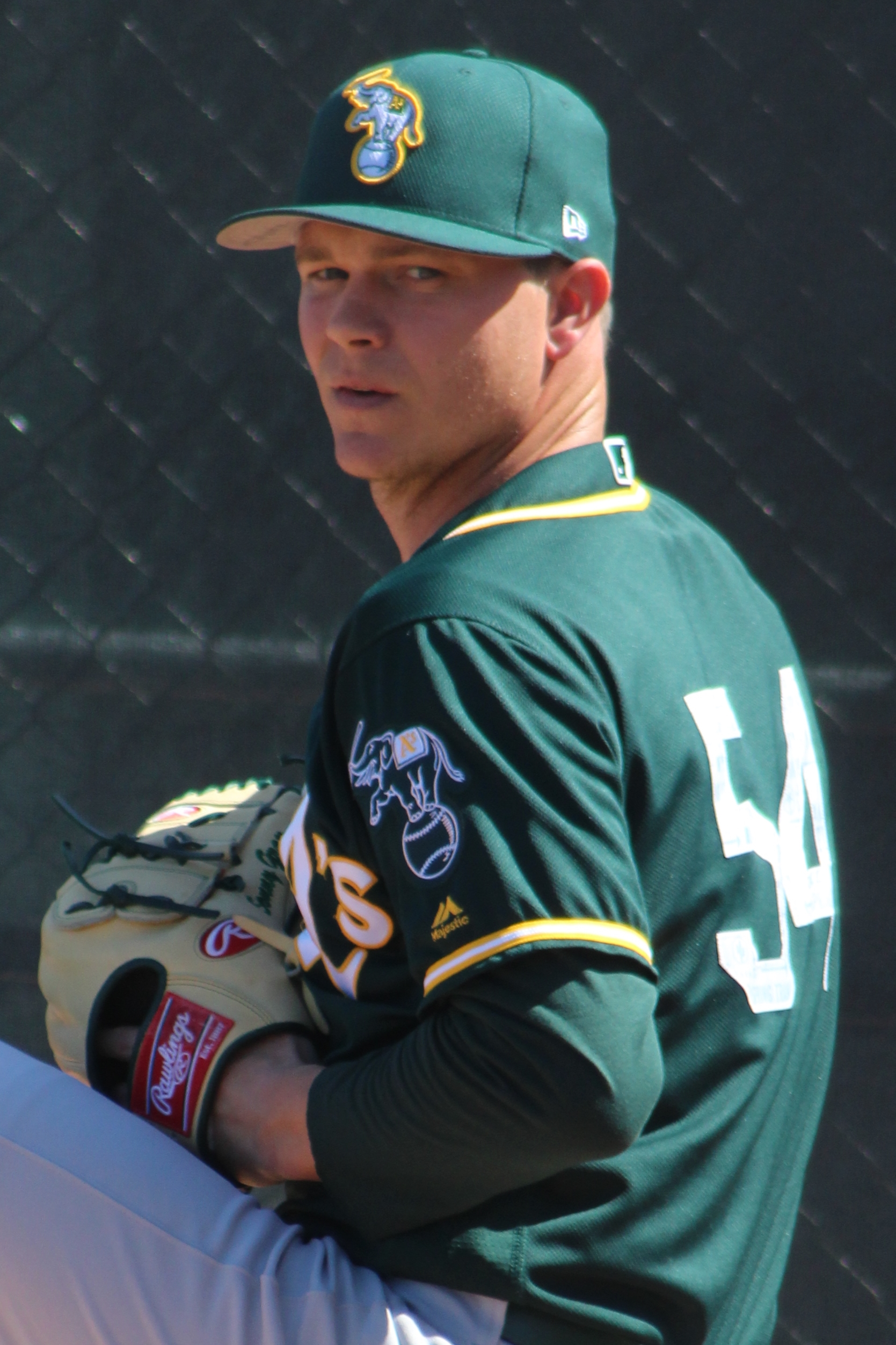
- Gray with the Oakland Athletics in 2017

Minnesota Twins – No. 54
- Pitcher
- Born: November 7, 1989 (age 37); Smyrna, Tennessee, U.S.
- Bats: Right Throws: Right

MLB debut
- July 10, 2013, for the Oakland Athletics

MLB statistics (through 2026 season)
- Win–loss record: 143–107
- Earned run average: 3.51
- Strikeouts: 2,074
- Stats at Baseball Reference

Teams
- Oakland Athletics (2013–2017); New York Yankees (2017–2018); Cincinnati Reds (2019–2021); Minnesota Twins (2022–2023); St. Louis Cardinals (2024–2025); Boston Red Sox (2026)

Career highlights and awards
- 3× All-Star (2015, 2019, 2023); AL wins leader (2026)

Sonny Douglas Gray (born November 7, 1989) is an American professional baseball pitcher for the Minnesota Twins of Major League Baseball (MLB). He has previously played in MLB for the Oakland Athletics, New York Yankees, Cincinnati Reds, St. Louis Cardinals, and Boston Red Sox.

Gray attended Vanderbilt University and played college baseball for the Vanderbilt Commodores. The Athletics selected Gray in the first round of the 2011 MLB draft. He made his MLB debut in 2013, won the American League Pitcher of the Month Award twice in 2014, and has been named an MLB All-Star in 2015, 2019, and 2023. He was the American League Cy Young Award runner-up in 2023.

== Early life ==
Gray was born in Nashville, Tennessee, to Cindy and Jesse Gray, and lived in Nashville until his family moved to Smyrna, Tennessee, before his eighth-grade year. His father died in a car accident during Gray's freshman year of high school, just as Gray started playing baseball for Smyrna High School.

As a freshman, he pitched and played left field and was named Freshman of the Year in District 9AAA. As a sophomore, he suffered injuries and saw limited action during the season. As a junior, he led his team to the 2007 State Tournament with an 11–2 win–loss record and a 0.95 earned run average (ERA). This earned him a nod for the AFLAC All-American High School Baseball Classic, and a nomination for National Player of the Year (which Tim Melville ultimately won). As a senior, he went 4–0 with a 0.79 ERA. However, he was injured in a district game in April 2008 that ended his season. He also excelled at the plate, batting over .500 his last two seasons at Smyrna, but instead opted to pitch in college.

In addition to his success on the mound, he also played quarterback for Smyrna's football team, guiding them to back-to-back 5A State titles in 2006 and 2007. He was voted Gatorade Player of the Year by The Tennessean in 2007 and 2008 for his overall athletic success. Gray also was involved in other extra-curricular activities in high school. He starred as the lead character (Troy Bolton) in his school's rendition of High School Musical on Stage!

Having already made a verbal commitment to Vanderbilt University before Smyrna's state tournament run, he was drafted in the 27th round by the Chicago Cubs in the 2008 MLB draft. He did not sign with the team.

== College career ==
As a freshman for the Vanderbilt Commodores baseball team, he began as a relief pitcher, earning four saves before moving to a starter's role late in the season. He posted a 4.30 ERA. He was designated as the ace of Vanderbilt's pitching staff in 2010 and 2011. In 2010, he went 10–5 with a 3.48 ERA, and led the team in strikeouts (113). Gray's junior year was his most successful, as he went 12–4 with a 2.43 ERA and 132 strikeouts. He also helped Vanderbilt earn their first-ever College World Series berth, making it to the semifinals and losing to national runner-up Florida.

== Professional career ==
=== Oakland Athletics ===
==== Minor leagues (2011–2013) ====
Gray was selected 18th overall by the Oakland Athletics in the 2011 MLB draft. He elected to forgo his senior year at Vanderbilt, and signed with Oakland for a $1.54 million signing bonus. After he signed, the Athletics assigned Gray to the Midland RockHounds of the Double-A Texas League. The next year, Gray began his season with Midland. There, he posted a 4.14 ERA before being promoted to the Sacramento River Cats of the Triple-A Pacific Coast League, where he struggled in his only start.

To start the 2013 season, Gray returned to the River Cats, where he posted a 2.81 ERA and was selected to start the Triple-A All-Star Game for the Pacific Coast League.

==== Major leagues (2013–2017) ====
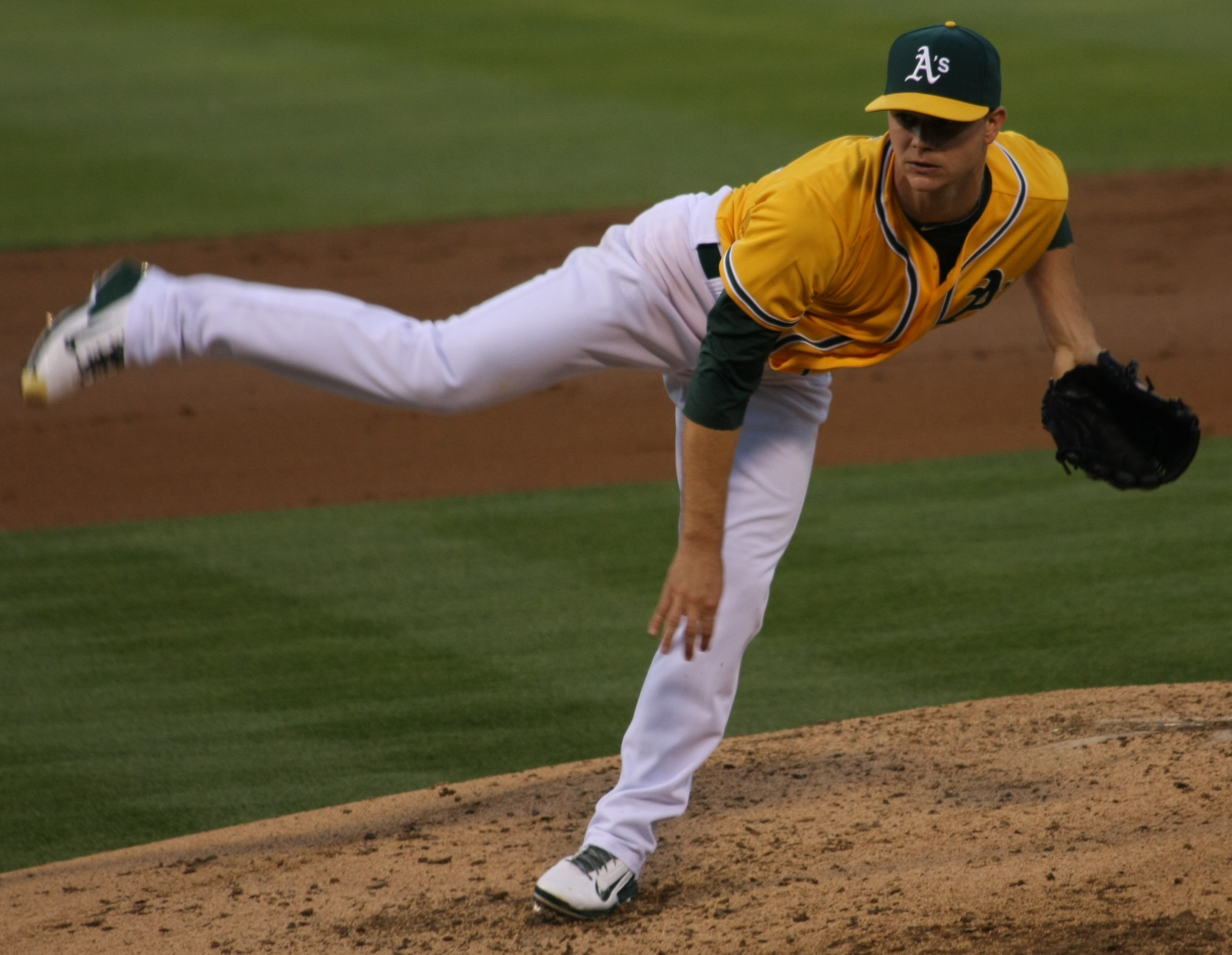
Gray pitching for the Oakland Athletics in 2013

On July 10, 2013, Gray was called up to replace Dan Straily, who had been optioned to Triple-A. He made his first major league appearance out of the bullpen, in relief of Jerry Blevins, against the Pittsburgh Pirates in Pittsburgh. Gray pitched two innings, tallying three strikeouts and allowing a single hit. He allowed neither a run nor a walk. Gray made a second relief appearance nine days later against the Los Angeles Angels of Anaheim but was then sent back down to the minors.

Gray was recalled again by the Athletics on August 10, and made his first Major League start against Mark Buehrle and the Toronto Blue Jays in Toronto. This was supposed to be just a spot start in Tommy Milone's place in the rotation after Milone's struggles and subsequent option down to Triple-A Sacramento. However, Gray would later become a fixture in the A's rotation as the fifth starter. Gray's first major league win came against Erik Bedard and the Houston Astros in his home debut. He pitched 8 shutout innings to earn a 5–0 win. On September 22, Gray pitched and won the AL West Division-clinching game against the Minnesota Twins. He finished the regular season, going 5–3 in 12 games (10 starts) with a 2.67 ERA, striking out 67 in 64 innings.

On October 5, Gray started Game 2 of the American League Division Series against Justin Verlander and the Detroit Tigers. In a no-decision effort, he pitched eight scoreless innings before a 9th inning walk-off hit by Stephen Vogt resulted in a 1–0 Oakland win. In a surprise move, Gray was elected to start Game 5 over Bartolo Colón. Facing Justin Verlander, Gray pitched 5+ innings, giving up six hits and three runs, getting the loss in the 3–0 game.

Despite not having previously been on an Opening Day roster, Gray made his first career Opening Day start on March 31, 2014, against the Cleveland Indians. He started the season 4–1 with a 1.76 ERA, while also recording his first complete game shutout, and 37 strikeouts in 41.0 innings pitched over six starts in April. For his early success, he was named AL Pitcher of the Month for the first time in his career. He would later go on to win AL Pitcher of the Month for July, as well. On the final day of the regular season, Sonny clinched the Athletics' third consecutive playoff spot with a complete game win on the road against the Texas Rangers. The A's would go on to lose the 2014 AL Wild Card Game to the Kansas City Royals in extra innings.

Gray was tabbed for a second straight Opening Day start for the Oakland Athletics on April 6, 2015, against the Texas Rangers. He pitched eight innings and allowed only one hit, holding the Rangers hitless until the eighth inning. Gray continued his success through mid-July, as he held a 10–3 record and a 2.04 ERA at the All-Star Break. He was selected to his first All-Star Game. He did not appear in the All-Star Game because he had started for the Athletics on the Sunday before the game.

Gray finished the season 14–7 with a 2.73 ERA. He finished third in the American League Cy Young Award voting, behind winner Dallas Keuchel and David Price. Gray failed to improve on his successful 2015 season, suffering multiple setbacks that twice landed him on the disabled list. He finished the season with a 5–11 record with a 5.69 ERA.

=== New York Yankees (2017–2018) ===
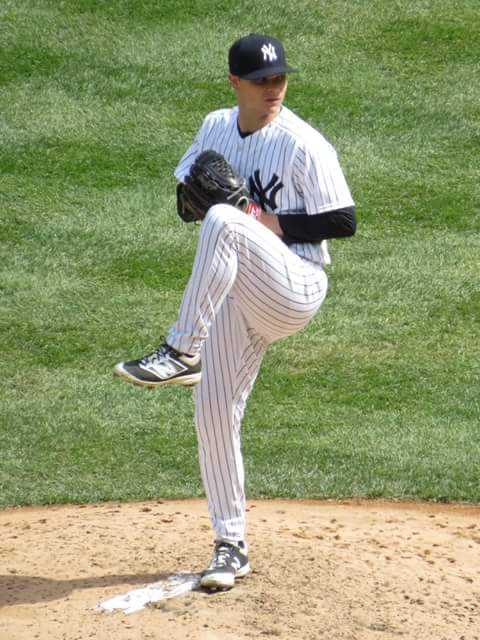
Gray with the Yankees in 2018

Gray was going to pitch for Team USA in the 2017 World Baseball Classic, but he failed to meet the requirements for insurance coverage and was unable to. On July 31, 2017, the Oakland Athletics traded Gray to the New York Yankees in exchange for Dustin Fowler, Jorge Mateo, and James Kaprielian. The Yankees would advance to the ALCS after overcoming a 2–0 series deficit against the Cleveland Indians in the ALDS, with Gray having been the losing pitcher for Game 1 after giving up three runs in 3.1 innings. New York would go on to lose the ALCS in seven games to the Houston Astros. Gray started Game 4 for the Yankees, lasting five innings while allowing two runs (one earned) on one hit.

Gray struggled throughout his tenure as a starter in 2018, losing his rotation spot to newly acquired teammate Lance Lynn after giving up seven runs in 2 2/3 innings to the Baltimore Orioles on August 1. Brian Cashman, the Yankees' general manager, later said that Gray had told him that he expected to be traded before the July 31 MLB trade deadline and that he hated being in New York; Bo McKinnis, Gray's agent, refuted this claim. Although he had a 3.62 ERA in road games, his ERA at Yankee Stadium was 7.71 and his total record as a Yankee prior to his demotion to the bullpen was 12–15 and a 4.85 ERA.

=== Cincinnati Reds (2019–2021) ===
On January 21, 2019, the Yankees traded Gray and Reiver Sanmartin to the Cincinnati Reds for Shed Long Jr. and a competitive balance draft pick in the 2019 MLB draft. The trade reunited him with pitching coach Derek Johnson, his pitching coach at Vanderbilt, and catching partner Curt Casali. Gray signed a three-year contract extension with the Reds prior to the trade. The Yankees then traded Long to the Seattle Mariners for Josh Stowers. After a relatively disappointing tenure with the Yankees, Gray bounced back his first year with the Reds. Going 11–8 with a 2.87 ERA, 1.084 WHIP, and a career best 10.5 strikeouts-per-nine-innings rate, Gray placed 7th in the NL Cy Young Award voting. Also, just days before the All-Star Game, Gray was named a replacement for Max Scherzer. This was Gray's second All-Star nomination and first since 2015.

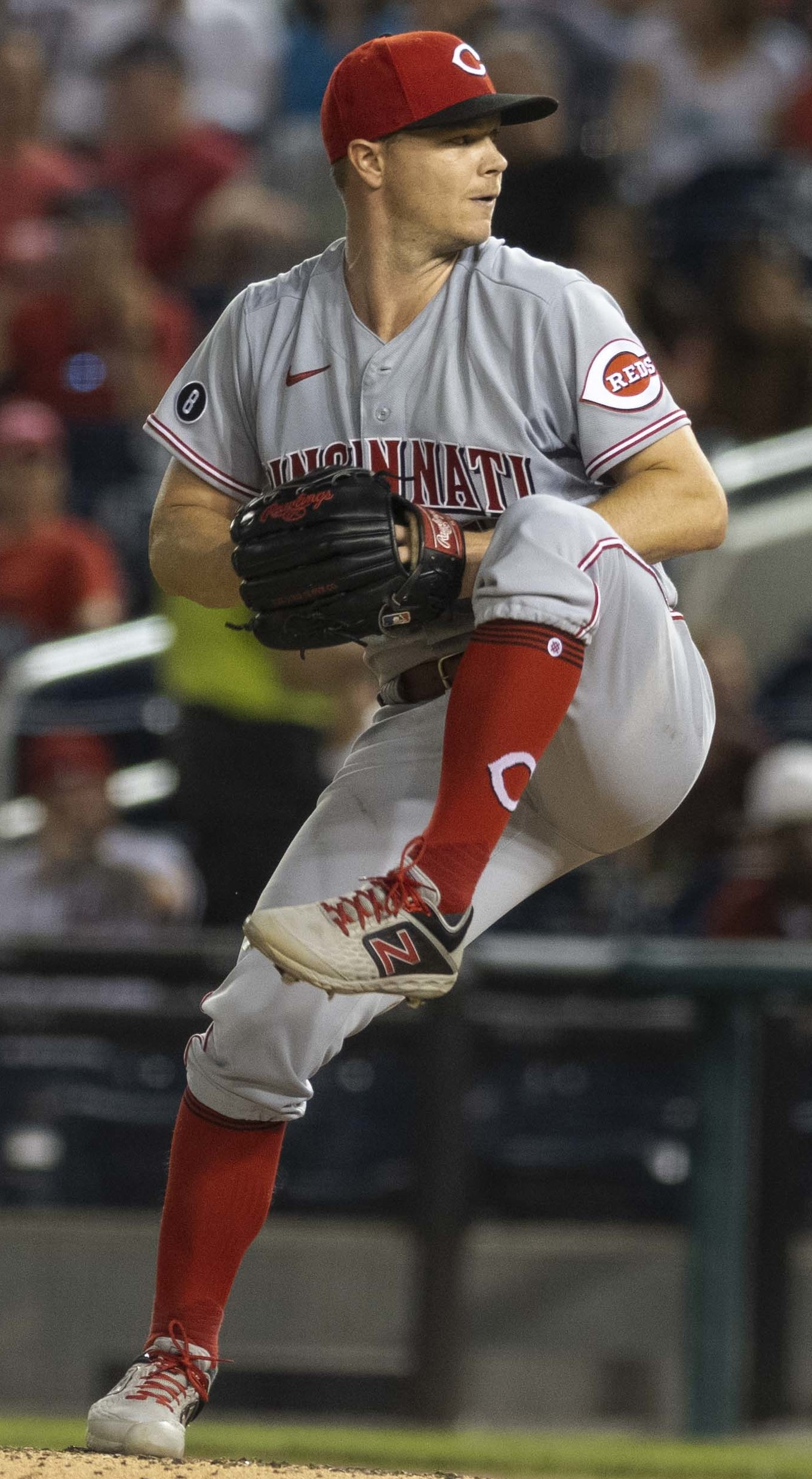
Gray with the Reds in 2020

In 2020, Gray was 5–3 with a 3.70 ERA. He led the NL in wild pitches, with seven. In 2021, Gray posted a 7–9 record with a 4.19 ERA and 155 strikeouts over 135 1/3 innings in 26 starts.

=== Minnesota Twins (2022–2023) ===
On March 13, 2022, the Reds traded Gray to the Minnesota Twins with Francis Peguero in exchange for Chase Petty.

On November 6, 2022, the Twins picked up Gray's $12 million team option for the 2023 season. At the midseason of the 2023 season, Gray for the third time of his career was designated as a pitcher for the American League in the 2023 Major League Baseball All-Star Game.

=== St. Louis Cardinals (2024–2025) ===
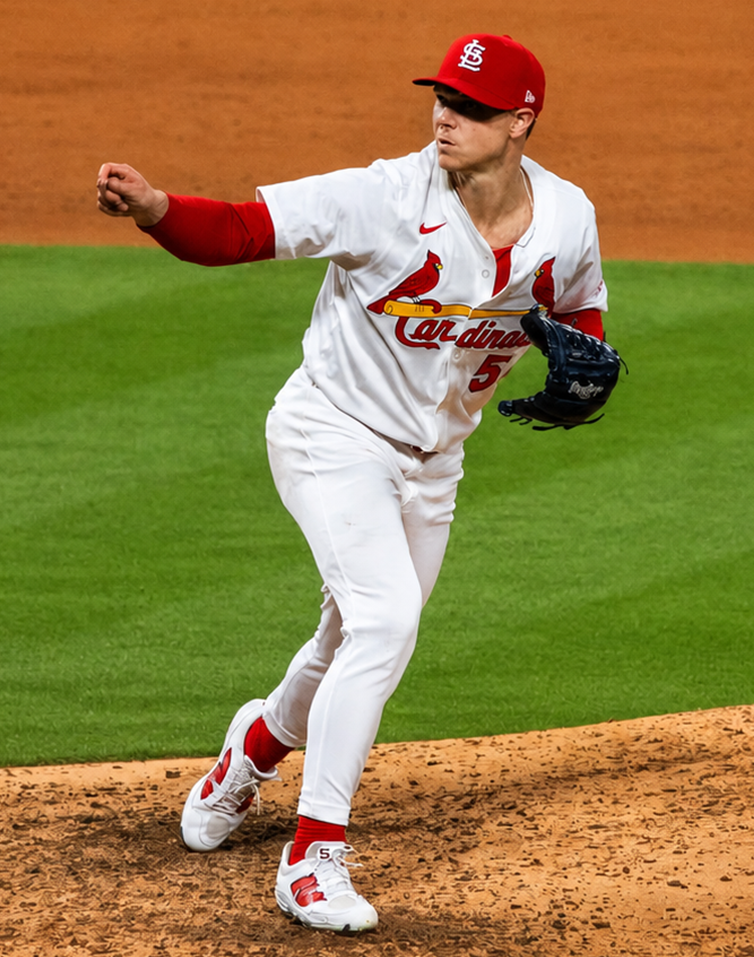
Gray with the Cardinals in 2025.

On November 27, 2023, Gray signed a three-year contract with the St. Louis Cardinals for $75 million. The deal also includes a no-trade clause club option for 2027. He made his debut on April 9, 2024, against the Philadelphia Phillies, pitching five scoreless innings and picking up the win. In 28 starts for the Cardinals during the year, Gray compiled a 13–9 record and 3.84 ERA with 203 strikeouts across 166 1/3 innings pitched.

On June 27, 2025, Gray pitched a Maddux, throwing only 89 pitches in a complete-game shutout against the Cleveland Guardians, with 11 strikeouts, no walks, and only 1 hit allowed. After the season, Gray indicated that he was willing to waive his no-trade clause to play for a contending team. He made 32 starts for St. Louis, compiling a 14–8 record and 4.28 ERA with 201 strikeouts across 180 2/3 innings pitched.

=== Boston Red Sox (2026) ===
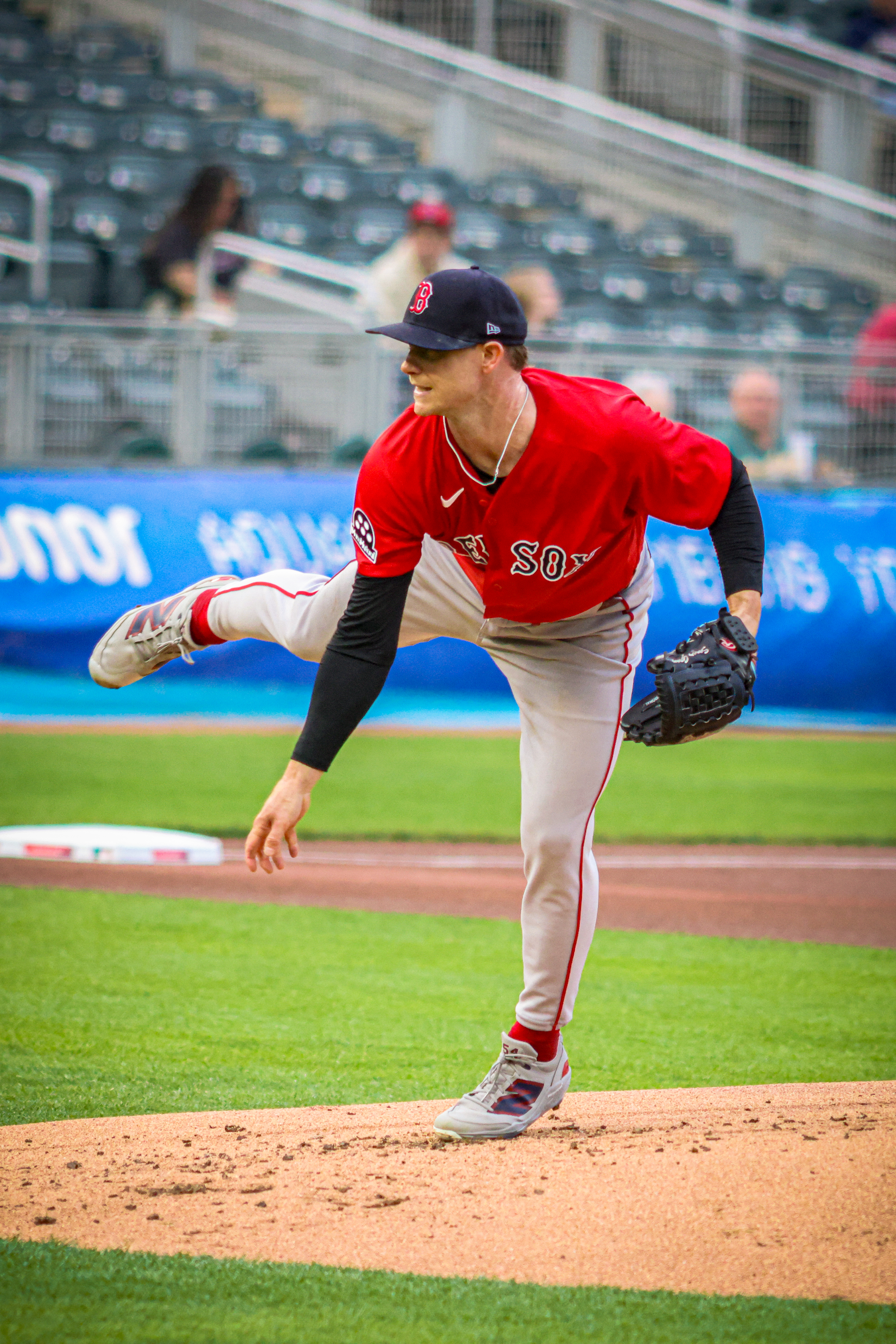
Gray with the Red Sox in 2026

On November 25, 2025, the Cardinals traded Gray and cash considerations to the Boston Red Sox in exchange for Richard Fitts, Brandon Clarke, and Patrick Galle.

On June 28, 2026, Gray took a no-hitter into the eighth inning against the New York Yankees, until it was broken up by an Amed Rosario single; in the same inning, Gray had punched out Spencer Jones for his 2,000th career strikeout. On October 30, the Red Sox declined their half of a mutual option, making him a free agent.

=== Minnesota Twins (second stint) ===
On November 18, 2026, Gray signed a two-year, $55 million contract with the Minnesota Twins.

== Pitching style ==
Gray's pitch repertoire includes a four-seam fastball from 91–95 miles per hour (146–153 km/h), a slider between 84–88 miles per hour (135–142 km/h), a curveball that ranges from 79–83 miles per hour (127–134 km/h), a cutter/two seam fastball between 89–92 miles per hour (143–148 km/h), and a changeup at 86–88 miles per hour (138–142 km/h).

== Personal life ==
Gray and his wife Jessica were married on November 12, 2016. The couple have two sons. They reside in Nashville.

== See also ==
- List of Major League Baseball career strikeout leaders
