= McKinnis =

McKinnis is a surname. Notable people with the surname include:

- Bo McKinnis, American sports agent
- Hugh McKinnis (born 1946), American football player and Canadian football player
- Simone McKinnis (born 1966), Australian netball coach

== See also ==
- McKinnis Peak, a mountain of Antarctica
