= The High Crusade =

1960 science fiction novel by Poul Anderson

- First edition
- Author: Poul Anderson
- Cover artist: Harry Schaare
- Language: English
- Genre: Science fiction
- Publisher: Doubleday
- Publication date: November 18, 1960
- Publication place: United States
- Media type: Print (hardback & paperback)
- Pages: 192

The High Crusade is a science fiction novel by American writer Poul Anderson, about the consequences of an extraterrestrial scoutship landing in medieval England. Poul Anderson described the novel as "one of the most popular things I've ever done, going through many book editions in several languages."

The High Crusade was originally serialized in the July–August–September 1960 issues of Astounding.

First published in book form in 1960 by Doubleday, it has been published in (at least) June 1964 and September 1968 (by Macfadden Books), 1983, 1991 (by the SFBC and again by Baen Books), 2003, and most recently in 2010. It is in print with a paperback edition issued by Baen Books in 2010 with ISBN 978-1-4391-3377-4.

Anderson's work was nominated for a Hugo Award in 1961, and was adapted into a 1983 wargame of the same name, The High Crusade, by TSR, Inc. and into a motion picture, also of the same name, in 1994. Anderson wrote one sequel short story, "Quest", which originally appeared in Ares magazine in the same issue that saw the original publication of the wargame.

== Plot summary ==
It is 1345, and in the English town of Ansby (in northeastern Lincolnshire), Sir Roger, Baron de Tourneville, is recruiting a military force to assist king Edward III in the Hundred Years' War against France. Suddenly, an enormous silver spacecraft lands outside the town. It is a scouting craft for the Wersgorix Empire, a brutal dominion light years from the Solar System. The Wersgorix hope to take over Earth and are testing the feasibility of colonization. However, the aliens, having forgotten hand-to-hand combat since it was made obsolete by their advanced technology, are caught off-guard by the angered Englishmen, who mistake the craft for a French trick. The villagers and soldiers in Ansby storm the craft and kill all but one Wersgor, Branithar.

Sir Roger formulates a plan that with the captured ship, he can take the entire village to France to win the war, and then liberate the Holy Land. The townspeople, with all of their belongings, board the ship at the baron's instruction, and prepare to take off. The people of Ansby are mystified at the advanced technology aboard the ship, which they come to call the Crusader. Being unable to pilot the Crusader Sir Roger directs the surly Branithar to pilot them to France. Instead, the alien wrecks the baron's plan by throwing the Crusader into autopilot on course to Tharixan, another Wersgor colony.

The Crusader arrives at Tharixan in days, and Sir Roger learns of this new world: it is sparsely populated, with only three fortresses, Ganturath, Stularax, and Darova (the chief base). The humans capture Ganturath but destroy the Crusader in the process, and thus details of the path back to Earth. Word spreads of the invaders and a meeting is arranged between Sir Roger and his soldiers and the chief of Tharixan, Huruga.

The humans and Wersgor hold talks that do very little to give either side any advantage, but a truce is agreed to. Sir Roger, in order to intimidate the aliens, makes up tall tales about his estate, "which only took up three planets" and his other accomplishments, including a very successful conquest of Constantinople. Sir Roger demands that the entire Wersgorix state submit to the king of England. During the talks, Baron de Tourneville ignores the truce, and orders the capture of the fortress of Stularax. Unfortunately, the entire base is obliterated by an atomic bomb. In retaliation, Huruga attacks Ganturath again, but loses. He is forced to give up.

Now comes Sir Roger's most outrageous plan; having captured Tharixan, he sets out to overthrow the Wersgorix Empire itself. He enlists the help of three other races oppressed by the Wersgor: the Jairs, the Ashenkoghli, and the Prʔ*tans.

Meanwhile, one of his main soldiers and friend, Sir Owain Montbelle, hatches a plan to return to Earth, something that Sir Roger has lost interest in. With Lady Catherine, Sir Roger's wife, Montbelle corners the baron and demands that he help the people of Ansby get back to Earth. De Tourneville gives in, but attacks Sir Owain in person. At the climax, Lady Catherine betrays Montbelle and kills him herself. Unfortunately, she also destroys the notes that could have helped get the villagers of Ansby back home.

Sir Roger goes on to topple the Wersgor Empire and build one for himself. He manages with the help of not only the species under the Wersgor, but from members of the Wersgor race who rebelled against their government. The religious figures in the story go on to establish a new branch of the Roman Catholic Church.

=== Prologue and epilogue ===
A millennium after the main events of The High Crusade, the holy galactic empire founded by Sir Roger and his people finally reunites with long lost Earth. A spacecraft from Earth comes across the empire, and is welcomed by the descendants of one of Sir Roger's leading soldiers.

There is, in the epilogue, a reference to events on Earth since 1345. The captain of the Earth ship is described as being a loyal subject of an Israeli empire. It also appears that Huruga wound up as an archbishop.

== Characters ==
- Sir Roger de Tourneville: Roger, Baron de Tourneville is fictional. He was an English knight in Ansby, Lincolnshire when he volunteered to raise an army to help king Edward III of England fight the Hundred Years' War in France. His wife is Lady Catherine.
- Lady Catherine, resents that Sir Roger is unable to provide her with a luxurious life or return to Earth, but ultimately loyal to him
- Brother Parvus, the narrator of The High Crusade
- Sir Owain Montbelle, Sir Roger's lieutenant, who conspires with the Wersgorix against Sir Roger
- Red John Hameward, a soldier under de Tourneville
- Sir Brian Fitz-William, a knight under de Tourneville
- Alfred Edgarson, a soldier under de Tourneville
- Thomas Bullard, a soldier under de Tourneville
- Branithar, the sole survivor from the original alien crew landing on Earth
- Chief ("Grath") Huruga, de facto ruler of Tharixan
- Hubert the executioner
- Tertiary Eggmaster of the Northwest Hive, aka "Ethelbert"

== Reception ==
Rating it five stars out of five, Galaxy reviewer Floyd C. Gale noted that the novel's "characters are well-drawn" and declared it "definitely a can't-be-put-down enthraller." The Hartford Courant found it to be "a delightfully witty science fiction satire," comparing it to The Mouse That Roared.

Critic Don D'Ammassa reported that "The novel's undeniable charm outweighs the frequent implausibilities."

== Movie adaptation ==
While George Pal considered filming the novel, he died in 1980 before doing so. The High Crusade was adapted as a motion picture in 1994, directed by Klaus Knoesel and Holger Neuhäuser, and produced by Roland Emmerich, Ute Emmerich, and Thomas Wöbke.

The movie version of The High Crusade differed in many significant respects from the novel. It was written with many comedy elements and had a much-reduced scope: the scoutship bearing the human knights landed at an isolated Wersgorix base, where they battled with the small Wersgorix battalion stationed there before eventually taking the ship back home. Poul Anderson himself avoided viewing the film, having been "told on good authority that it's a piece of botchwork."

=== Cast ===
- John Rhys-Davies as Brother Parvus
- Rick Overton as Sir Roger de Tourneville
- Catherine Punch as Lady Catherine
- Patrick Brymer as John "Red John" Hameward
- Debbie Lee Carrington as Branithar
- Rinaldo Talamonti as Huruga
- Holger Neuhäuser as Hubert "The Executioner"
