= Roger King =

Roger King may refer to:

- Roger King (politician) (born 1943), English political figure; member of parliament, 1983–1992
- Roger King (producer) (1944–2007), American television production executive
- Roger King (novelist) (born 1947), English novelist and filmmaker
- Roger Lee King, American engineer
- Roger King, English keyboard player with Steve Hackett's band

== See also ==
- King (surname)
- King Roger (disambiguation)
