= The Dame's the Game =

1960 novel by Al Fray

- Author: Al Fray
- Cover artist: Harry Schaare
- Language: English
- Genre: Crime
- Publisher: Dell
- Publication date: 1960
- Publication place: United States
- Media type: Print (paperback)
- Pages: 142 pp
- Preceded by: Built for Trouble

The Dame's the Game is a crime novel by American novelist Al Fray. It was published in April 1960 as a Popular Library (paperback) Edition. The cover painting is by Harry Schaare.

== Plot introduction ==
Joe Tanner doesn't realize it, but the floating craps game he unwinds with after a hard day's work is rigged against him. His blonde bombshell wife, Shelly, sees through the con but can't get Joe to take her seriously. In Las Vegas, she enlists the aid of casino detective Barney Conroy. Soon the pair find themselves between the police, who suspect them of the murder of Joe Tanner, and the real murderers, a mysterious gang that is determined to get rid of Shelly and Barney, too.

== Plot summary ==
Shelly Tanner's husband Joe is a wealthy industrialist conducting military-sponsored research on Cold War armaments and intelligence gear. To relax, Joe has taken to shooting craps in a high-stakes floating game situated in various Los Angeles locations. He consistently loses serious sums of money, but out of obsession with the idea that his luck has to change, he returns to the game night after night. His beautiful, sexually frustrated wife Shelly sees through the crooked game, but can't convince Joe to stop throwing his money away. In desperation she drives to Las Vegas to enlist the aid of casino detective Barney Conroy.

At first, Barney wants nothing to do with free-lance work. He prefers the predictable security of his casino job. But when he is roughed up in the casino parking lot by thugs obviously tied to the Tanner affair, his injured pride compels him to find Shelly and promise his assistance. Shelly brings Barney and Joe together in Los Angeles and they all visit the craps game. Barney quietly confirms that the game is rigged. He thinks he recognizes the stickman as a dishonest but cowardly neighbor from his boyhood home in Kansas City, but doesn't know if he himself has been recognized.

After discussing the crooked nature of the game with a still-unreceptive Joe, Barney and Shelly form an amorous association. Shelly decides to leave Joe. As she and Barney spend a blissful first night together in a nearby motel, Joe returns to the craps game and uses the information Barney uncovered to confront the gang running it. Their response is to overpower him, take him to his own home and kill him using Shelly's gun. The gang's operatives have followed Barney and Shelly to the motel, know what they're up to, and anonymously tip the police that the pair are Joe's murderers.

Barney and Shelly are arrested and both spend some time in jail, but because no evidence directly implicates him, Barney is released. He uses his freedom to discover the real motives and the subrosa political affiliations of the gang members and, with the help of Shelly's high-priced Hollywood lawyer, successfully leads the FBI into a night-time, seaside gun battle where the gang is defeated.
