= Earl Austin =

Earl Austin may refer to:

- Earl Edwin Austin, American criminal and bank robber
- Earl C. Austin Jr., American business executive
