= Damir Novosel =

Founder of Quanta Technology

- Born: 21 December 1957; SR Bosnia and Herzegovina, Yugoslavia
- Education: University of Tuzla; University of Zagreb; Mississippi State University
- Occupations: Electrical engineer, Entrepreneur
- Awards: Fellow of the IEEE, Member of National Academy of Engineering
- Scientific career
- Workplaces: Quanta Technology

Damir Novosel is the founder and president of Quanta Technology, Raleigh, North Carolina. Novosel got his PhD in electrical engineering from Mississippi State University where he was a Fulbright scholar, after obtaining bachelor's degree from the University of Tuzla and master's degree from University of Zagreb.

He was a Vice President of ABB Automation Products, President of IEEE Power & Energy Society, and has authored or coauthored more than 100 articles in transactions, journals, and proceedings. He holds 16 U.S. and international patents. Novosel became a Fellow of the IEEE in 2003, and a member of the National Academy of Engineering in 2014.
