= The High Crusade (board game) =

Board game

The High Crusade is a 1983 board wargame published by TSR in Ares magazine #16.

== Gameplay ==
The High Crusade is a game based on the novel The High Crusade by Poul Anderson, and simulates the rebel Crusaders attempting to overthrow the invading Wersgorix empire.

== Reception ==
Rick Swan reviewed The High Crusade in Space Gamer No. 71. Swan commented that "With the demise of Ares, it'd be a shame if a great game like The High Crusade got lost in the shuffle. There are apparently no plans to reissue Ares games in boxed versions, so you'll have to round up a copy of issue 16 to get the game. It's worth the effort. The High Crusade is an absolute treat."
