= Come Back for More =

1958 novel by Al Fray

- Author: Al Fray
- Language: English
- Genre: Crime
- Publisher: Dell
- Publication date: 1958
- Publication place: United States
- Media type: Print (paperback)
- Pages: 159 pp
- Preceded by: The Dice Spelled Murder
- Followed by: Built for Trouble

Come Back for More, by American novelist Al Fray, was published in 1958 as a paperback by Dell.

== Plot introduction ==
In River City, bank teller "Swede" Anderson puts the finger on a syndicate murderer and learns the cost of civic duty the hard way. With his tail between his legs, he barely gets out of town before the mob takes deadly revenge. A few years later, disguised as hard-muscled Irish hobo "Mac" McCarthy, Anderson returns to River City with a plan to even the score.

== Plot summary ==
After testifying against the murderer of bank guard Pop Walters, "Swede" Anderson finds himself number one on the River City, California crime syndicate's hit list. He barely escapes fiery death after the mob wires a bomb into the door of his car. Captain Domms of the city police is unable to protect him or, worse, has his own hand in the mob's pocket. Seeing no refuge for himself in River City, Anderson rides the rails out of town and fades from local memory.

Anderson realizes that after four years of hobo living has melted away his flab, the sun has turned his formerly pale skin to leather, and a run-in with a railyard bull has left his nose broken and his cheek scarred, he is scarcely recognizable as his old self. With a bottle of henna he completes the transformation by coloring his blond hair red. Under the name of his late hobo pal, Mac McCarthy, Anderson returns to River city with revenge on his mind. There, he signs on as a driver with Tyler Trucking. The firm is being run by Gail Tyler, following her father's death—under suspicious circumstances—in a high-speed truck wreck. Anderson soon learns that between the union and the crime syndicate it fronts, the lifespan of a trucker in River City is not entirely in the trucker's hands.

Using a mix of guts, muscle, and brains, Anderson builds a reputation as a cool-headed tough whose only interest is in a quick dollar. He manages to infiltrate the mob, but soon finds himself in over his head. In what he thinks will be a simple heist, he becomes an unwilling accessory to the murder of the head of a rival trucking firm. In this he implicates not just himself but also Tyler Trucking and Gail, with whom he has developed a romantic attachment. Investigating the crime, Captain Domms fails to see through Anderson's Mac McCarthy disguise and proves himself no more able to enforce the law than he'd been four years ago.

Never losing his nerve, Anderson ultimately wins the mob bosses' full confidence and is taken into a plot to rob the same bank he worked in when Pop Walters was killed. While rehearsing for the robbery, Anderson sees through the mob's plan to murder him after he plays his part—to avoid making the generous payoff it's promised him. Anderson develops a counter-strategy, but realizes the mob has turned the tables on him when the next rehearsal suddenly becomes the real thing. As the story reaches its climax, Anderson has only moments to adapt his half-formed plan to the new scenario, save his life, and find the revenge he has sought.
