= Built for Trouble =

1958 novel by Al Fray

- Author: Al Fray
- Language: English
- Genre: Crime
- Publisher: Dell
- Publication date: 1958
- Publication place: United States
- Media type: Print (paperback)
- Pages: 159 pp
- Preceded by: Come Back for More
- Followed by: The Dame's the Game

Built for Trouble, by American novelist Al Fray, was published in 1958 as a Dell (paperback) First Edition.

== Plot introduction ==
When a beautiful starlet makes a monkey of him during a publicity stunt, L.A. lifeguard Eddie Baker loses more than face; his dreams of a leisurely lifetime on the beach evaporate. In pursuit of compensation from the starlet, Eddie takes a page from the blackmailer's book but very soon finds himself in deeper trouble than he ever could have imagined.

== Plot summary ==
Shapely starlet Nola Norton finds a gimmick to get the attention of a major Hollywood studio. At a beautiful Southern California beach she pretends to be drowning and lures lifeguard Eddie Baker into deep water. In circumstances that completely disorient Eddie, Nola uses a concealed underwater breathing device, constructed for her by Eddie's supervisor, to hold Eddie underwater until he passes out. She then contrives to rescue him, which gains her the press she's been seeking, but effectively costs Eddie his career.

When Eddie learns that his rescuer has landed a $150,000 studio contract on the strength of the publicity he unwittingly helped her gain, he determines to claim a share of the money for himself. He uncovers the connection between Nola and his supervisor, Hank Sawyer, now dead under mysterious circumstances. He determines that Nola and her sleazy theatrical agent, Joe Lamb, murdered Hank not only because of his complicity in the lucrative publicity stunt, but also because of what he knew about Nola's past as a teen-age prostitute in San Diego—the kiss of death for an aspiring Hollywood star. Armed with this information— and enough material evidence to hang Nola in both the criminal justice system and the court of public opinion—Hank offers Nola a "business proposition" which falls little short of blackmail.

Varied games of cat-and-mouse ensue, in which Nola unsuccessfully uses her charms to neutralize Eddie's assault on her income. Meanwhile, Joe Lamb convinces his vivacious, red-headed associate Carol Taylor to become involved in tracking Eddie to his desert hiding place. There Eddie and Carol become more than just friends. When Joe accompanies Carol to her next rendezvous with Eddie, he pulls a gun and takes steps to put Eddie out of the way, as he and Nola did with Hank Sawyer. Surprised and horrified, Carol steps in on Eddie's behalf and accidentally shoots and kills Joe. Eddie takes extraordinary risks to dispose of Joe's body in a way that will not implicate himself or the distraught Carol.

While this seems to put the police off the scent, back in Los Angeles Nola puts the pieces together and threatens to expose Eddie as Joe's murderer. With the stakes this high, a showdown is inevitable. Eddie tracks Nola and her movie-star beau to a yacht off the shores of Catalina Island, where once more murder hangs in the night air. Eddie finds Nola a formidable adversary to the end, as the novel comes to its explosive conclusion.
