= Reiver Sanmartín =

Colombian baseball player (born 1996)

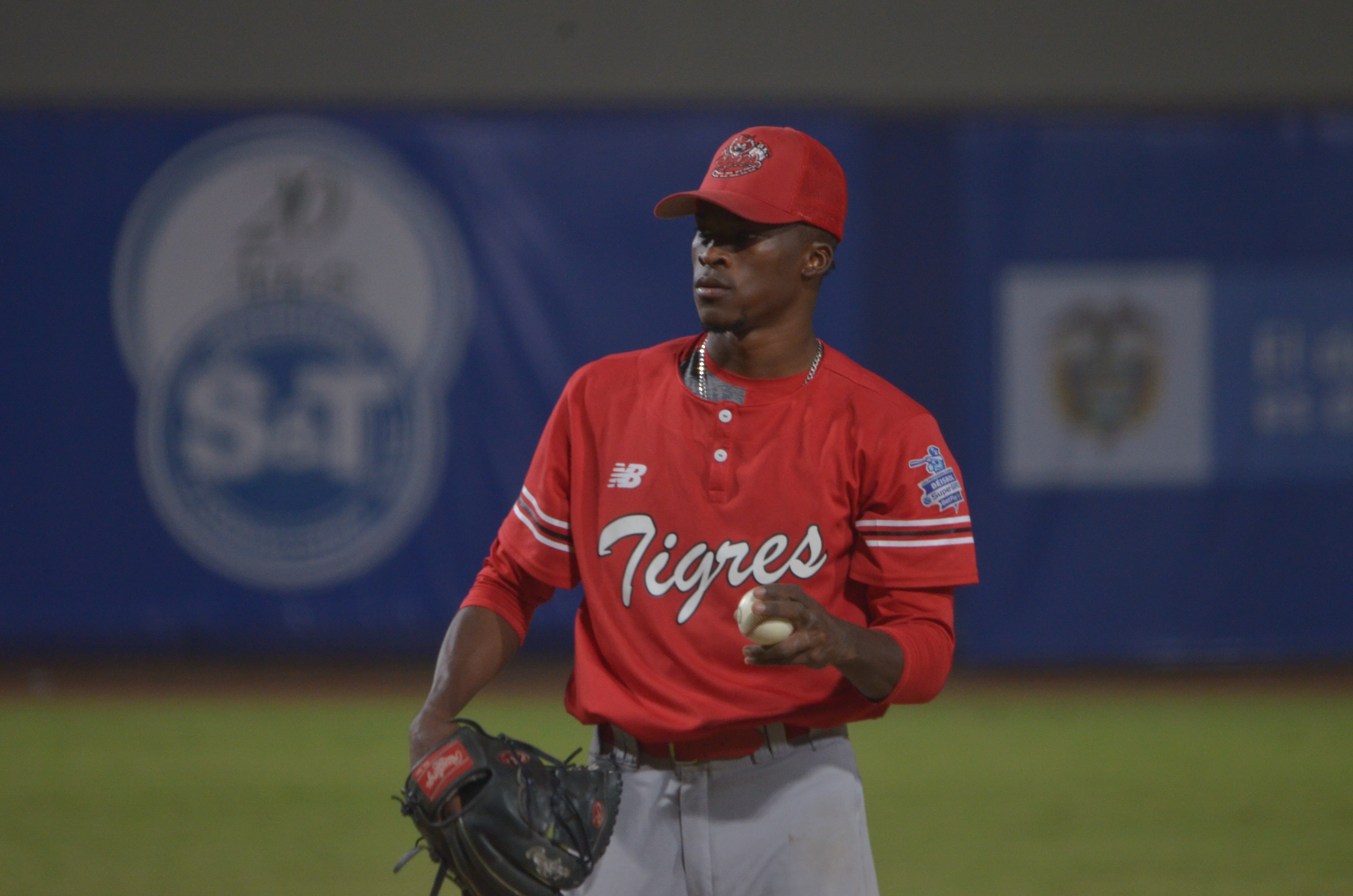
- Sanmartín with the Tigres de Cartagena in 2021

Washington Nationals
- Pitcher
- Born: April 15, 1996 (age 30); Cartagena, Colombia
- Bats: Left Throws: Left

MLB debut
- September 27, 2021, for the Cincinnati Reds

MLB statistics (through 2026 season)
- Win–loss record: 10–4
- Earned run average: 5.37
- Strikeouts: 89
- Stats at Baseball Reference

Teams
- Cincinnati Reds (2021–2023, 2025); San Francisco Giants (2026)

Reiver José Sanmartín (born April 15, 1996) is a Colombian professional baseball pitcher for the Washington Nationals of Major League Baseball (MLB). He has previously played in MLB for the Cincinnati Reds and San Francisco Giants.

== Career ==
=== Texas Rangers ===
Sanmartin signed as an international free agent with the Texas Rangers on July 2, 2015. Sanmartin spent the 2016 and 2017 season with the DSL Rangers of the Rookie-level Dominican Summer League; going 0–1 with a 5.23 ERA over 10 1/3 innings in 2016, and 7–1 with a 2.35 ERA and 56 strikeouts over 61 1/3 innings in 2017. He split the 2017 season between the Spokane Indians of the Low-A Northwest League and the Hickory Crawdads of the Single-A South Atlantic League, going a combined 7–2 with a 2.45 ERA and 56 strikeouts over 66 innings.

=== New York Yankees ===
On November 20, 2017, Sanmartin was traded to the New York Yankees in exchange for Ronald Herrera. Sanmartin split the 2018 season between the Low-A Staten Island Yankees, the Single-A Charleston RiverDogs, the High-A Tampa Tarpons, and the Double-A Trenton Thunder. Between the four levels, he posted a combined 5–7 record with a 2.81 ERA and 58 strikeouts over 67 1/3 innings.

=== Cincinnati Reds ===
On January 21, 2019, Sanmartin and Sonny Gray were traded to the Cincinnati Reds in exchange for Shed Long Jr. and draft pick compensation. Sanmartin split the 2019 season between the High-A Daytona Tortugas, and the Double-A Chattanooga Lookouts, going a combined 4–12 with a 4.05 ERA and 114 strikeouts over 122 1/3 innings.

Sanmartín did not play in a game in 2020 due to the cancellation of the Minor League Baseball season because of the COVID-19 pandemic. Sanmartin split the 2021 minor league season between Chattanooga and the Triple-A Louisville Bats, going a combined 10–2 with a 3.32 ERA and 112 strikeouts over 100 1/3 innings.

On September 27, 2021, Sanmartin's contract was selected to the active roster to make his MLB debut versus the Pittsburgh Pirates. In two starts in his rookie campaign, Sanmartin logged a pristine 1.54 ERA with 11 strikeouts in 11 2/3 innings of work. Sanmartin spent the 2022 season mainly working out of the Reds' bullpen, making 45 appearances (4 starts) and registering a 4–4 record and 6.32 ERA with 47 strikeouts in 57 innings pitched.

Sanmartin began the 2023 season working out of Cincinnati's bullpen as a situational reliever. In 14 games, he struggled to a 7.07 ERA with 13 strikeouts in 14 innings pitched. On May 7, he departed an appearance against the Chicago White Sox with what was described as left elbow soreness. He was placed on the 60-day injured list on May 14 with a stress reaction in his left elbow. On July 7, Sanmartin underwent season–ending UCL surgery. He was non-tendered and became a free agent on November 17.

On November 19, 2023, Sanmartín re–signed with the Reds on a minor league contract. He spent the majority of 2024 with Triple–A Louisville, making 18 appearances and logging a 7.36 ERA with 18 strikeouts across 18 1/3 innings pitched.

Sanmartín began the 2025 season back with Louisville, where he compiled a 6-2 record and 2.75 ERA with 45 strikeouts across 42 appearances. On September 2, 2025, the Reds selected Sanmartín's contract, adding him to their active roster. He made one scoreless appearance for Cincinnati, striking out two over 1 2/3 innings pitched.

=== San Francisco Giants ===
On November 6, 2025, Sanmartín was claimed off waivers by the San Francisco Giants. On March 25, 2026, Sanmartín was placed on the 60-day injured list due to a right hip flexor strain. He was activated for his team and season debut on June 10. Sanmartín made 24 appearances for San Francisco, posting a 3–0 record and 4.22 ERA with 16 strikeouts across 21 1/3 innings pitched. On November 2, Sanmartín was designated for assignment by the Giants.

=== Washington Nationals ===
On November 6, 2026, Sanmartín was traded to the Washington Nationals in exchange for Robert Cranz.
