= The Dice Spelled Murder =

Novel by Al Fray

- Author: Al Fray
- Language: English
- Genre: Crime
- Publisher: Dell Publishing Company, Inc.
- Publication date: 1957
- Publication place: United States
- Media type: Print (paperback)
- Pages: 191
- OCLC: 123238238
- Preceded by: And Kill Once More
- Followed by: Come Back for More

The Dice Spelled Murder, by American novelist Al Fray, is an American crime novel published in 1957 by Dell Publishing Company, Inc. as a first edition paperback. The jacket notes to Fray's subsequent novel, Come Back for More, refer to The Dice Spelled Murder as a "best selling" novel.

== Plot introduction ==
Danny is a master with the dice and Velma could con any man into anything. As a pair they cruise the California convention circuit, hustling suckers and raking in the dough. Where will their greed finally take them? To the fulfillment of their dreams? Or to sudden, violent death?

== Plot summary ==
Danny Hogan, a truck driver disaffected with his job at Torgus Trucking, meets beautiful Velma Reed in a seedy Los Angeles bar where she has been working as the bartender's shill, enticing lonely men to buy drinks. Danny doesn't recognize Velma, but the two of them attended the same high school in a distant city, where they were only casually acquainted.

Danny was expelled from high school after being caught using loaded dice in an after-school craps game. A short time later, and unbeknownst to Danny, Velma became pregnant and also left school and their home town. Now, a dozen years later, Velma recognizes Danny and renews their acquaintance. Appealing to his greed and his masculinity, she convinces him to use his skills with crooked dice in a confidence game to help her separate convention-goers from their money. At first reluctant because of a beating he received in the Army after being caught using altered dice, Danny eventually agrees, hoping to amass enough money to start his own trucking company. He soon comes to realize that Velma, too, has a loftier purpose in mind—buying a motel in Las Vegas that she can operate, in order to become "legit" and no longer feel ashamed of the way she earns money to support her young son, whom she has placed in a boarding school.

The bulk of the novel's action surrounds Velma's artful pickup of likely suckers at conventions, mostly in California cities, and Danny's subsequent fleecing of them in craps games. Their adventures bring them into contact with a number of ordinary and extraordinary characters, including a gay con artist toward whom Danny displays a disdain that was probably more politically correct in 1957 than it seems now. Various close calls ensue, and Danny loses some of his enthusiasm for the con. He tells Velma he wants to quit, but she convinces him to run the con with her one last time.

Along the way, and unbeknownst to Danny, Velma and another male friend, Joe Lovelli, have committed blackmail. Velma has twice enticed men to her hotel room, where Joe waited in a closet with a camera. Using infrared film, Joe snapped photographs of the men in compromising positions with Velma. The blackmailers then extorted—or attempted to extort—hush-up money from their victims. Danny remains unaware of Velma and Joe's sideline until near the end of the book, when Velma's second blackmail victim, a mob-related big shot, propels the novel to its climax in a fatal car chase.

After struggling with a conflict between conscience and ambition, Danny mails the bulk of his dishonest gambling earnings to Velma's young son, keeping only enough to buy a good used truck so that he and Jill Conner—the pretty, young, former office manager at Torgus Trucking—can start their own trucking firm.
