= Ralph Salaway =

American novelist

Ralph Wellner Salaway (November 13, 1913 – October 25, 1991) was a California novelist who authored five books of hardboiled crime fiction in the 1950s and 1960 under the pseudonym Al Fray. Salaway's pseudonym is derived from the Pig Latin translation of his first name (and thus is a "pen" name in two senses.)

While his 1955 book, And Kill Once More, is a whodunit in the classic style, Salaway's 1957 and 1958 novels have more to do with the common man's involvement in crime and the moral dilemmas that arise as he confronts his own behavior and that of others. In this way, Salaway's fiction may reflect the same zeitgeist that produced many of the most cerebral television scripts of the late 1950s and early 1960s such as those of Rod Serling (The Twilight Zone, etc.) and Gene Roddenberry (Have Gun, Will Travel, etc.).

Salaway's final novel as Al Fray, 1960's The Dame's the Game, involves a lawman of sorts—a Las Vegas casino house detective—who leaves legitimacy behind in the name of vengeance. Notes on the cover of that book refer to it as "A Barney Conroy Suspense Novel," suggesting that others existed or were planned; however, no others were published.

== Works of Ralph Salaway as Al Fray ==
- And Kill Once More (1955)
- The Dice Spelled Murder (1957)
- Come Back for More (1958)
- Built for Trouble (1958)
- The Dame's the Game (1960)

== Translations ==
- Attention : freins puissants (1959) French translation of Come Back for Me
- Aux Pieds de la Sirène (1960) French translation of Built for Trouble
- Un pari à Las Vegas (1961), French translation of The Dame's the Game
- Dados Cargados (1960) Spanish translation of The Dame's the Game
