= Shed Long Jr. =

American baseball player (born 1995)

Shed Long
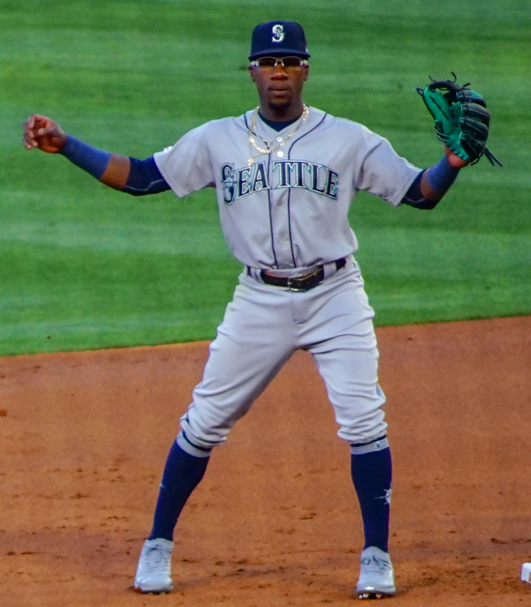
- Long with the Seattle Mariners in 2019

York Revolution – No. 1
- Second baseman
- Born: August 22, 1995 (age 31); Birmingham, Alabama, U.S.
- Bats: Left Throws: Right

MLB debut
- May 11, 2019, for the Seattle Mariners

MLB statistics (through 2021 season)
- Batting average: .216
- Home runs: 12
- Runs batted in: 41
- Stats at Baseball Reference

Teams
- Seattle Mariners (2019–2021)

Shedric Bernard Long Jr. (born August 22, 1995) is an American professional baseball second baseman for the York Revolution of the Atlantic League of Professional Baseball. He has previously played in Major League Baseball (MLB) for the Seattle Mariners.

== Professional career ==
=== Cincinnati Reds ===
Long attended Jacksonville High School in Jacksonville, Alabama. He was drafted by the Cincinnati Reds in the 12th round (375th overall) of the 2013 Major League Baseball draft. He made his professional debut that year with the Arizona League Reds, batting .256 with one home run and eight RBI in 24 games, and played 2014 with the Billings Mustangs where he batted .172 in 29 games. After starting his professional career as a catcher, Long was converted into a second baseman in 2015. He played 2015 with the Dayton Dragons where he compiled a .283 batting average with six home runs and 16 RBI in 42 games. Long started 2016 with Dayton before being promoted to the Daytona Tortugas during the season. In 132 total games between the two teams, he slashed .293/.371/.471 with 15 home runs and 75 RBI along with 21 stolen bases. In 2017, he played for both Daytona and the Pensacola Blue Wahoos, collecting a combined .281 batting average with 16 home runs and 50 RBI in 104 total games between both affiliates.

On November 20, 2017, the Reds added Long to their 40-man roster to protect him from the Rule 5 draft. He spent the 2018 season with Pensacola, batting .261 with 12 home runs and 56 RBI in 126 games.

=== Seattle Mariners ===
On January 21, 2019, the Reds traded Long and a compensation draft pick in the 2019 MLB draft to the New York Yankees for Sonny Gray and Reiver Sanmartin. The Yankees then traded Long to the Seattle Mariners for Josh Stowers.

Long began the 2019 season with the Tacoma Rainiers. On May 10, he was called up to the major league roster for the first time. He made his major league debut on May 11 versus the Boston Red Sox. In 42 games for Seattle, Long hit .263 with 5 home runs. In 2020, Long's offensive output dipped as he finished hitting only .171 with 3 home runs and 9 RBI. On September 22, 2020, Long underwent surgery on his right tibia to repair a stress fracture in his right shin, prematurely ending his 2020 season.

On April 27, 2021, Long was placed on the 60-day injured list as he continued to recover from the injury. On June 7, Long was activated off of the injured list. He hit a walk-off grand slam on June 20, 2021, in the bottom of the tenth inning that gave the Mariners a 6–2 victory against the Tampa Bay Rays. On August 2, Long was placed back on the injured list with a right shin stress reaction, and was transferred to the 60-day injured list on August 28, ending his season. On October 22, Long was outrighted off of the 40-man roster. He elected free agency on November 7.

=== Baltimore Orioles ===
On February 16, 2022, Long signed a minor league contract with the Baltimore Orioles. He appeared in 31 games split between the rookie-level Florida Complex League Orioles, Single-A Delmarva Shorebirds, High-A Aberdeen IronBirds, and Triple-A Norfolk Tides. In 99 at-bats, Long hit .192/.316/.263 with no home runs and 12 RBI. He was released by the Orioles organization on August 16.

=== High Point Rockers ===
On April 28, 2023, Long signed with the High Point Rockers of the Atlantic League of Professional Baseball. In 95 games for the Rockers, he batted .307/.394/.487 with 13 home runs, 59 RBI, and 20 stolen bases. Following the season, Long was named an Atlantic League All–Star.

=== Olmecas de Tabasco ===
On April 8, 2024, Long signed with the Olmecas de Tabasco of the Mexican League. In three games for Tabasco, he went 0–for–6 with no walks. Long was released by Tabasco on April 19.

=== Cleburne Railroaders ===
On April 29, 2024, Long signed with the Cleburne Railroaders of the American Association of Professional Baseball (AAPB). In 95 appearances for Cleburne, he batted .310/.409/.467 with nine home runs, 74 RBI, and 16 stolen bases. While on the Railroaders, Long was loaned to the AAPB's Kane County Cougars to participate in the 2025 Baseball Champions League Americas.

=== Gastonia Ghost Peppers ===
On September 2, 2025, Long was traded to the Gastonia Ghost Peppers of the Atlantic League of Professional Baseball in exchange for a player to be named later. Long made 11 appearances for Gastonia, slashing .340/.396/.383 with nine RBI and four stolen bases.

=== York Revolution ===
On October 7, 2025, Long and Tyler Wilson were traded back to the Cleburne Railroaders to complete a previous transaction. He would not appear in a game for the Railroaders. On July 7, 2026, Long signed with the York Revolution of the Atlantic League of Professional Baseball.
