= Roger (disambiguation) =

Roger is a masculine given name and a surname; please see that article for all people and animals, real or fictional, with that name.

Roger may also refer to:

- Roger (radio communications), a word used in radiotelephony procedures to mean "message received"
- Roger (automobile), a 1920s car
- Roger (TV series), a Pakistan TV show

== See also ==
- Rogers (disambiguation)
- Rodger, a surname and given name
- King Roger, 1926 Polish opera
