= Allison W. Pearson =

American management scientist

Allison W. Pearson is an American management scientist, the W. L. Giles Professor Emeritus at Mississippi State University, and a former interim associate vice president of the university.
