= Quanta Technology =

Quanta Technology LLC
- Company type: Subsidiary
- Founded: 2006
- Headquarters: Raleigh, North Carolina
- Owner: Quanta Services
- Website: www.quanta-technology.com

Quanta Technology LLC is a utility infrastructure consulting company based in Raleigh, North Carolina. It is a wholly owned subsidiary of Quanta Services.

== Overview ==
Quanta Technology provides management and technical consulting for utilities, heavy industry, and related entities. The focus is on industry leadership rather than standardized project offerings. As such, most Quanta Technology consultants have graduate degrees and are active in the publication of books, technical papers, and/or patent applications. Many have been elected to the IEEE (Institute of Electrical and Electronics Engineers) membership grade of Fellow.

Typical services relate to the following areas: aging infrastructure; smart grid; energy efficiency; post disaster system assessment; distribution reliability; distribution automation; transmission reliability; protection and automation; system planning; standards assessment; engineering studies; power quality; arc flash studies; maintenance management; asset management; risk management; due diligence; expert witness; regulatory support; benchmarking; aging workforce; seminars; courses; and training.

== Initial formation as InfraSource Technology ==
In 2006, InfraSource Services hired three senior consultants to start and grow a technology and consulting group. Up until this point, InfraSource was primarily a specialty contractor performing outsourced maintenance and construction for utilities and heavy industry. The vision of InfraSource was to create complementary engineering and technology capabilities. Design engineering was to be built primarily through acquisitions and technology/consulting was to be grown organically. InfraSource Technology officially began operations in July 2006.

== Quanta acquisition and name change ==
On August 30, 2007, Quanta Services acquired InfraSource Services through an all-stock deal. Before the merger, Engineering News-Record ranked Quanta Services as the second-largest specialty contractor in the United States and InfraSource Services as No. 8. This acquisition received popular attention after being given positive coverage on Jim Cramer's Mad Money show and in the magazine Smart Money.

After the acquisition, InfraSource Technology changed its legal name to Quanta Technology LLC. In terms of the original InfraSource strategy, Quanta Services decided to (1) support the growth of Quanta Technology, and (2) not aggressively increase its capability in design engineering. Quanta Technology is organizationally located in the Electric & Gas division of Quanta Services.
