= Josh Stowers (baseball) =

American baseball player (born 1997)

Free agent
- Outfielder
- Born: February 25, 1997 (age 29); Chicago, Illinois, U.S.
- Bats: Right Throws: Right

Joshua Stowers (born February 25, 1997) is an American professional baseball outfielder who is a free agent.

== Career ==
Stowers attended Mount Carmel High School in Chicago, Illinois. He attended the University of Louisville and played college baseball for the Louisville Cardinals. In 2017, he played collegiate summer baseball with the Chatham Anglers of the Cape Cod Baseball League.

=== Seattle Mariners ===
The Seattle Mariners selected Stowers in the second round of the 2018 Major League Baseball draft. He signed with the Mariners and was assigned to the Everett AquaSox, batting .260 with five home runs, 28 RBIs, and twenty stolen bases over 58 games.

=== New York Yankees ===
On January 21, 2019, the Mariners traded Stowers to the New York Yankees in exchange for Shed Long. He spent 2019 with the Charleston RiverDogs, slashing .273/.386/.400 with seven home runs, 40 RBIs, and 35 stolen bases over 105 games. He did not play in a game in 2020 due to the cancellation of the minor league season because of the COVID-19 pandemic.

=== Texas Rangers ===
On April 6, 2021, the Yankees traded Stowers and Antonio Cabello to the Texas Rangers in exchange for Rougned Odor. Stowers spent the 2021 season with the Frisco RoughRiders of the Double-A Central, hitting .220/.311/.466 with 20 home runs, 21 stolen bases, and 57 RBI. Stowers returned to Frisco for the 2022 season, hitting just .222/.331/.374 with 10 home runs and 49 RBI.

=== Los Angeles Dodgers ===
On December 7, 2022, Stowers was selected by the Los Angeles Dodgers in the minor league phase of the Rule 5 draft. The Dodgers assigned him to the Double–A Tulsa Drillers, where he appeared in 86 games and batted .174 with nine homers and 24 RBI. Stowers was released by the Dodgers organization on November 9, 2023.

=== Gastonia Baseball Club ===
On April 18, 2024, Stowers signed with the Gastonia Baseball Club of the Atlantic League of Professional Baseball. In 105 games for Gastonia, Stowers batted .301/.391/.499 with 17 home runs, 73 RBI, and 49 stolen bases. He became a free agent following the season.

=== Algodoneros de Unión Laguna ===
On March 10, 2025, Stowers signed with the Algodoneros de Unión Laguna of the Mexican League. In 54 appearances for Unión Laguna, he batted .237/.320/.364 with five home runs, 28 RBI, and nine stolen bases. Stowers was released by the Algodoneros on June 26.

=== Charros de Jalisco ===
On July 2, 2025, Stowers signed with the Charros de Jalisco of the Mexican League. He made 29 appearances for Jalisco, batting .254/.432/.403 with two home runs, seven RBI, and six stolen bases. On April 3, 2026, Stowers was released by the Charros.
