= Priscilla Slade =

American university administrator

Priscilla Dean Slade was president of Texas Southern University (TSU) from October 27, 1999, until June 2006.

== Education ==
She holds a doctor of philosophy degree in accountancy from The University of Texas at Austin, a master's degree from Jackson State University, and a bachelor's degree from Mississippi State University.

== Career at TSU ==
Slade joined the TSU faculty in October 1991 as the chair of the accounting department. In 1992, she was named dean of the school of business and in 1999, president of the university. In 2006 she was fired as president, following an audit that found she had used more than $650,000 in university funds to cover personal expenses including personal landscaping, kitchenware, and a massive bar tab. Indicted on four felony counts, her 2007 trial ended in a hung jury. Scheduled to be retried in 2008, she accepted a plea deal on March 26, 2008, pleading "No Contest" to the charges and accepting 10 years of deferred adjudication, repayment of $127,672.18 to the school, and 400 hours of community service.

Quintin F. Wiggins, the chief financial officer of the university during Dr. Slade's tenure as president, was found guilty of similar charges and sentenced to ten years in prison; he is appealing his conviction. Bruce Wilson, former vice president for purchasing, is awaiting trial. In March 2008 prosecutors raised the possibility of allowing both men to testify against Dr. Slade in her retrial, in return for immunity.

In December 2007 the Southern Association of Colleges and Schools placed Texas Southern University on probation.

She is now a professor at Florida Agricultural and Mechanical University, in Tallahassee, Florida.
