= Earl C. Austin Jr. =

American business executive, CEO of Quanta Services

Earl C. "Duke" Austin Jr.
- Born: Earl C. Austin Jr. Texas, U.S.
- Citizenship: American
- Education: Sam Houston State University (B.B.A. in Management)
- Occupation: Business executive
- Employer(s): Quanta Services, Inc.
- Title: President and CEO of Quanta Services
- Term: 2016-Present
- Predecessor: James O'Neil
- Board member of: Texas State University System Board of Regents
- Children: 4
- Awards: Distinguished Alumni Award, Sam Houston State University (2016)
- Website: quantaservices.com

Earl C. "Duke" Austin Jr. is an American business executive who has served as president and chief executive officer (CEO) of Quanta Services since March 2016. He previously held the role of chief operating officer from 2013 to 2016. Under his leadership, Quanta has expanded its infrastructure-services business in electric power, pipelines, and communications sectors.

== Early life and education ==
Austin earned a Bachelor of Business Administration (B.B.A.) in management from Sam Houston State University in Huntsville, Texas, in 1992, where he later received the university's Distinguished Alumni Award in 2016.

== Career ==
=== Early career ===
Before joining Quanta, Austin served as president of North Houston Pole Line, L.P., a Texas-based electric power and utility infrastructure company. He led that operating unit through its growth phase and integration into Quanta Services.

=== Quanta Services ===
Austin joined Quanta Services in October 2009 as president of its Oil and Gas (pipeline) Division. From May 2011 to December 2012, he served concurrently as president of Quanta's Electric Power Division and Oil and Gas Division. In January 2013, he was promoted to chief operating officer. He became president and CEO, as well as a director on the company's board, in March 2016.

Under Austin's leadership, Quanta has expanded its capabilities in assessment, planning, engineering and design, procurement, construction, commissioning, and operation of electric power and pipeline infrastructure systems. During his tenure, Quanta has grown into one of the largest specialized contracting firms in North America.

== Other roles and affiliations ==
Austin serves on several business and civic boards, including:

- the executive committee of the Greater Houston Partnership;
- the board of the Southwest Line Chapter of the National Electrical Contractors Association;
- the board of the Junior Achievement of Southeast Texas (JASET);
- and the Texas State University System Board of Regents.

== Recognition ==
Austin received the Distinguished Alumni Award from Sam Houston State University in 2016. He has been recognized in industry publications for promoting safety culture and operational excellence in large-scale utility contracting.

== Compensation ==
According to filings, Austin's total compensation as president and CEO of Quanta Services in fiscal year 2024 was approximately US$15.6 million, including base salary, bonuses, and stock awards.

== Personal life ==
Austin resides in Houston, Texas, with his wife, three sons, and one daughter.
