= Quanta Services =

American infrastructure services corporation

Quanta Services, Inc.
- Type: Public
- Traded as: NYSE: PWR; S&P 500 component
- Founded: 1997
- Headquarters: Williams Tower; Houston, Texas
- Key people: Earl C. Austin Jr. (CEO)
- Revenue: ▲$29.94 billion USD (Feb 2024) ▲$9.466 billion USD (2017)
- Number of employees: 62,000
- Website: quantaservices.com

Quanta Services is a U.S. corporation that provides infrastructure services for the electric power, pipeline, industrial and communications industries. The company has grown organically since its founding, but it has also acquired over 200 companies in the electrical contracting and other construction industries. In the 2020s, it has been involved in the construction of data centers as a consequence of the rise of artificial intelligence and its need for electrical power.

Quanta Services employs about 62,000 people. Its operating companies achieved combined revenues of about $29.9 billion (US) in 2025. It is headquartered in Houston, Texas. In 1998, Quanta went public on the New York Stock Exchange under the ticker symbol PWR ("power").

== History ==
=== Formation and early leadership ===
John R. Colson, founder and former executive chairman of Quanta Services, influenced the consolidation of the U.S. electrical contracting industry in the late 20th century. He began his career at PAR Electrical Contractors in Kansas City, Missouri, a firm specializing in high-voltage transmission lines, distribution lines, substations, and other electric utility infrastructure services. He was then was promoted to manager of engineering services; then became vice president of operations. By the early 1980s, Colson was executive vice president and general manager. In the late 1980s, he acquired ownership of PAR, becoming its president in 1991.

During this period, the U.S. electrical contracting sector was highly fragmented, comprising approximately 50,000 predominantly small, owner-operated enterprises. In 1997, Colson combined PAR with three other regional contractors—Union Power Construction Co., Trans Tech Electric Inc., and Potelco Inc.—to form Quanta Services, headquartered in Houston, Texas.

=== Initial public offering and financial growth ===
In February 1998 Quanta completed its initial public offering (IPO), raising $45 million. In July 2000, the company offered selling an additional 2.72 million shares. According to the company's website, the company had acquired Manuel Brothers, Smith Contracting, Telecom Network Specialists, North Pacific Construction Company, NorAm Telecommunications, Spalj Construction Company and Golden State Utility Company. Acquired electric contractors included Harker & Harker, Sumter Builders and Environmental Professional Associates. Hybrid acquisitions included Wilson Roadbores and Underground Construction Company.

In 2009 the company replaced Ingersoll Rand on the S&P 500 Index.

=== UtiliCorp takeover bid ===
In 2001, Quanta became the target of a takeover attempt by UtiliCorp United Inc. (later Aquila, Inc.), an energy company with which Quanta had maintained a business relationship since the 1950s.

At the time, UtiliCorp held a 38.5% equity stake in Quanta—a part of a strategic alliance under which UtiliCorp outsourced all of its utility maintenance operations to Quanta. Quanta's leadership resisted the attempted acquisition. In October 2001, the two companies entered into a standstill agreement, effectively halting further acquisition efforts. The following month, Quanta adopted a shareholder rights plan—a "poison pill"—to prevent UtiliCorp from increasing its ownership stake beyond 39%. Tension escalated into a proxy contest in 2002, as Quanta alleged that UtiliCorp, facing mounting financial difficulties, sought to assume control to consolidate Quanta's earnings into its financial statements. The dispute was resolved in May 2002, when UtiliCorp withdrew its takeover bid and all associated litigation. As part of the settlement, both parties agreed to a revised corporate governance structure, including changes to the composition of Quanta's board of directors.

=== Sale of telecommunication and fiber-optic licensing divisions ===
On November 20, 2012, Quanta sold its telecommunications subsidiaries for $275 million in cash to Dycom. On August 4, 2015, the firm sold its fiber optic licensing operations (Sunesys) to Crown Castle International Corp. (NYSE: CCI) for approximately $1 billion(US) in cash.

=== Acquisitions ===
According to its website, Quanta employs a decentralized acquisition strategy that allows its acquisitions to retain their management, brand and customers. In 2025, it has over 200 acquired companies employing 62,000 workers. Acquisitions began shortly after the original company was formed. In 1999, the organization acquired 11 companies with total revenues of $150 million(US). In 2000, the firm bought the Utilities Construction Company, TVS Systems, Southeast Pipeline Construction, MC Underground, the Croce Electric Company, and the Eastern Communications Corporation.

In 2007, Quanta bought Infrasource Services for $1.26 billion(US) in an all-stock transaction. In 2009, it purchased Price Gregory, specializing in the building of large-diameter transmission pipelines, for $350 million(US) in a cash and stock deal. In 2019, Quanta purchased Hallen Construction, a gas utility contractor serving the northeast, contractors R.R. Cassidy and Florida's Marathon Construction Services for $328 million(US) in cash and $2 million(US) in stock. In 2021 the firm purchased the Blattner Company, a Minnesota-based renewable contracting company, for $2.7 billion(US) in stock and cash, growing the rapidly expanding renewable energy resources category. Also in 2021, Quanta acquired William E. Groves Construction of Madisonville, Kentucky.

In 2023, the company added RP Construction Services, a solar power contractor. The same year, Quanta purchased Pennsylvania Transformer Technology, designer and builder of transformers, substation units and other electrical power components, for $300 million(US) in a cash and stock transaction. In 2024, the firm bought California-based Cupertino Electric for $1.5 billion(US) in a mostly cash transaction helping Quanta position itself as an all-purpose power transmission and distribution resource. Cupertino, founded in 1954, was the US’ sixth largest electrical contractor and has installed electrical power in over 20 million sq. ft. of data centers. It was experiencing exponential growth with the onset of artificial intelligence. Cupertino Electric has long been a major contractor, subsequently Quanta was ranked No. 1 on ENR’s 2023 Top 600 Specialty Contractors list. Engineering News-Record said the transaction was the “biggest deal of the year” in the electrical construction sector. Following the acquisition, the company continued to execute larger projects; a 2025 IBEW Local 332 newsletter reported crews performing electrical installation on an approximately 268,500-square-foot EdgeCore data-center project, underscoring sustained demand tied to AI-driven computing growth. In September 2024, Quanta Services acquired 100+ year-old Niagara Power Transformer, a Buffalo, New York $15 million in sales manufacturer of medium-voltage, liquid-filled power transformers.

Also in 2024, the firm acquired the electric power components manufacturer Sherman and Reilly, founded in Chattanooga in 1927. Quanta acquired its first steel mill, Hybar LLC, whose Arkansas plant will be manufacturing steel rebar for large energy power projects.

In July 2025, Quanta completed acquisition of Dynamic Systems, a provider of mechanical, plumbing and process infrastructure services based in Austin, Texas. The acquisition had an initial consideration of approximately $1.26 billion in cash and 518,772 shares of Quanta common stock, with additional contingent consideration of up to $216 million.

In the fourth quarter of 2025, Quanta acquired Tri-City Group, and electrical infrastructure services company based in Davenport, Iowa, and Wilson Cronstruction Company, and electric utility infrastructure services company.

In December 2025, subsidiary Quanta Aviation Services, had acquired Billings Flying Service, a Montana-based heavy-lift and aerial firefighting operator. The acquisition expands Quanta's aviation capabilities within the utilities and construction sectors, with Billings Flying Service continuing its operations under existing management and contracts.

In 2026, Quanta continued its acquisition strategy, acquiring several infrastructure-services companies. During the second quarter and July, it acquired Phalcon, a Connecticut-based electrical services company, and Enerfab Holdings, an engineering, fabrication, manufacturing and construction company.

=== Leadership ===
On March 14, 2016, Earl C. “Duke” Austin succeeded former chief executive officer Jim O’Neil. Austin is currently president, chief executive officer and chief operating officer. He is a graduate of Sam Houston State University in Huntsville, Texas, and the former president of Quanta's Operating Unit: North Houston Pole Line.

== Major projects ==
=== SunZia Transmission and Wind Project ===
In 2023, the Pattern Energy Group chose Quanta to build the SunZia Transmission and Wind Project, a 550-mile, 525 kV high voltage transmission project that will relay power from a New Mexico wind farm across the US Southwest. Quanta's Blattner will supply equipment for the wind farm and switchyard. Quanta will also design and construct the 3.5 GW wind power farm that will provide the power for transmitting. Construction was finished in 2025. Plans for the project were initially submitted in 2006 but full approval took 17 years. The Pattern Energy Group closed $11 billion (US) in non-recourse financing for construction of the tandem projects, which were called by Pattern to be among “…the largest clean energy infrastructure projects in U.S. history.”

=== Colorado Power Pathway ===
Also in 2023, Xcel Energy awarded Quanta a contract to manage the construction of the Colorado Power Pathway, 610 miles of 345 kV transmission wires, towers and substations through 12 counties in eastern Colorado. The project will increase Colorado's power grid reliability and provide accessibility for future renewable energy projects. The utility is investing $1.7 billion (US) in the Pathway project that will provide renewable electric power from Colorado's Eastern Plains to the Front Range. This project also offers support for Xcel's Clean Energy Plan which is projected to lessen carbon emissions by 85% by 2030 as well as the utility's 2050 carbon vision whereby they plan to provide 100% carbon-free electric power.

=== Gateway South ===
In 2022, PacifiCorp elected contractors including the company—acting through its Quanta Infrastructure Solutions Group—to perform engineering, procurement, and construction work on the Gateway South transmission project.

=== East West Tie Line Project ===
Valard Construction, a subsidiary of the company, was named by Nextbridge Infrastructure in 2022 to provide construction services for the East-West Tie transmission line in northwestern Ontario.

=== Gateway West Transmission Line ===
PacifiCorp also engaged contractors including Quanta Services subsidiary Summit Line Construction to provide construction management, craft labor, and related engineering services for segments of the Gateway West transmission project which was completed in 2020.

=== Keystone Pipeline ===
Subsidiaries of the company, including Price Gregory International and Pumpco, were part of a group of six companies who performed construction work on portions of the Keystone Pipeline system developed by TC Energy.

=== Fort McMurray Transmission Project ===
In 2019, the Alberta (Canada) Utilities Commission approved a $1.6 billion (Can) electric power transmission project that runs from Edmonton to the Fort McMurray area. The project included building a 500 km single-circuit transmission line, three optical repeater locations and expansion of an existing substation. The project was awarded to the Alberta PowerLine team – Canada Utilities, Atco and Quanta to “develop, finance, design, build, own, operate and maintain” the line. Funding came through the largest (at the time) public-private-partnership in Canada's history and was also the longest 500 kV transmission line in the country. The Ft. McMurray project was completed on budget, three months before its scheduled completion.

=== Mountain Valley Pipeline ===
The company's Price Gregory International, a Quanta Services company, built the spread E6, 27 miles of 42-inch diameter natural gas pipeline as part of the Mountain Valley Pipeline in West Virginia. The project was completed in 2024. (PG portion in 2018) for EQT Corporation.

=== Lower Rio Grande Valley Energized Reconductor Project ===
On June 13, 2016, American Electric Power (AEP) received the 89th annual Edison Electric Institute's (EEI's) 2016 Edison Award, an electric power industry honor, for its Energized Reconductor Project in the Lower Rio Grande Valley (LRGV) of Texas. The 240-mile project was managed by Quanta Energized Services planning capabilities and North Houston Pole Line's construction expertise.
