= Quest (Anderson novelette) =

- Short story by Poul Anderson
- Country: United States
- Language: English
- Genre: Science fiction

Publication
- Publisher: Ares
- Media type: Magazine
- Publication date: 1983
- Pages: 8

"Quest" is a science fiction novelette by American writer Poul Anderson, about the consequences of an extraterrestrial scoutship landing in medieval England. It is a sequel to Anderson's 1960 novel The High Crusade. Poul Anderson described the original as "one of the most popular things I've ever done, going through many book editions in several languages." "Quest", originally appeared in Ares magazine in the same issue that saw the original publication of The High Crusade wargame. The novelette was included in two collections of Anderson's short work, Space Folk and Going for Infinity, before being added to the Baen Books fiftieth anniversary edition of The High Crusade.

== Plot summary ==
In 1375, in the English capital of Troynovaunt (on the conquered Wersgor planet), Sir Eric is recruiting a military force to seek out the Holy Grail. Sir Eric formulates a plan that with the mustered ship, which they come to call the Bonaventura, he can take the small army to the planet where the Holy Grail is held. The small army, with all of their belongings, board the ship at king Roger's instruction and prepare to take off.

== Characters ==
- King Roger: The king of the English Empire. He was known as Baron de Tourneville in The High Crusade. His wife is Lady Catherine.
- Sir Thomas Hameward: The narrator of Quest, a son of Red John Hameward (a knight serving under Baron de Tourneville in The High Crusade) and the squire of Sir Eric.
- Sir Eric: A prince of blood of the English Empire who seek out the Holy Grail.
