= Harry Schaare =

American painter

- Born: May 23, 1922; New York City
- Died: April 9, 2008 (aged 85); Phoenix, Arizona
- Occupation: Painter

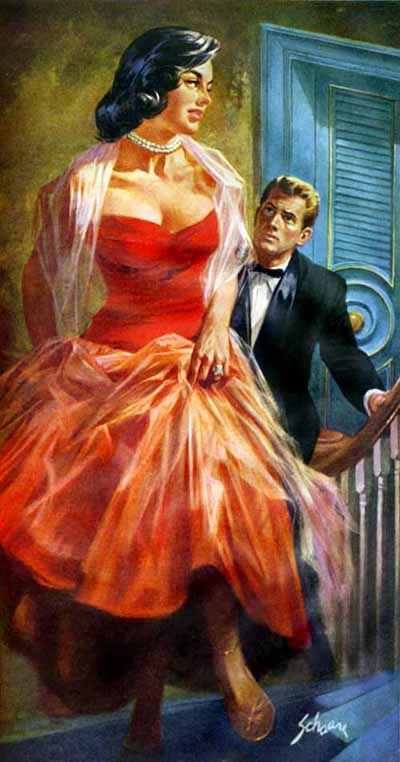
"The Pursuit of Happiness", 1956

Harry Schaare (May 23, 1922 – April 9, 2008) was an American painter whose work has primarily served the book cover and magazine illustration markets.

Schaare was born in the Jamaica area of New York City. Early on he studied architecture at New York University. He was a pilot with the United States Army Air Forces during World War II. In 1947 he graduated from Pratt Institute.

He did illustrations for Boys Life, Sports Illustrated, Reader's Digest, Aviation Week and several other magazines. He was the artist for a broad array of book covers in a wide variety of genres.

In 1975, he got into western art galleries, and then in 1981, moved to Arizona to continue his art.
