= Bo McKinnis =

American sports agent

Bo McKinnis is a Major League Baseball sports agent. He was a student manager of the baseball team at Mississippi State University. While attending graduate business school at Vanderbilt University, he was asked by a Mississippi State teammate, Pete Young (who pitched in the Major Leagues with the Montreal Expos), to serve as his sports agent. He has gone on to represent over 100 Major League players, including Paul Byrd, R. A. Dickey, Sonny Gray, and Rusty Greer. He has represented over 20 first round draft picks, including Dewon Brazelton (third overall in 2001) and David Price (first overall in 2007).

== Career ==
McKinnis is one of only two agents to have twice set the record for the largest signing bonus ever given to a drafted pitcher. In 2001, he set the record for the largest signing bonus ever given to a drafted pitcher with Dewon Brazelton receiving $4.2 million from the Tampa Bay Rays. In 2007, McKinnis broke his own record when David Price received an even larger signing bonus, $5.6 million, also from the Rays.

Both Cy Youngs

In 2012, McKinnis became the first, and only, agent ever to represent both Cy Young Award winners in the same year. David Price won the award in the American League and R. A. Dickey won the award in the National League.

Arbitration Record

In January 2015, McKinnis negotiated the largest one-year contract in the history of Major League Baseball salary arbitration when David Price received a 2015 salary of $19,750,000 from the Detroit Tigers.

Largest Major League Salary and Largest Pitchers Contract

In December 2015, McKinnis negotiated the largest contract in Major League Baseball history for a pitcher when David Price received a seven-year $217 million contract from the Boston Red Sox. This also tied the record for largest average salary ever received by any player at $31 million per year, tying with Miguel Cabrera of the Detroit Tigers. This contract is also the largest contract ever in the history of the Boston Red Sox franchise.

In December 2025, the Associated Press reported that Yankees general manager Brian Cashman said Sonny Gray had told him McKinnis advised Gray to express interest in playing for the Yankees despite not wanting to play in New York, in order to avoid reducing his free-agency value. McKinnis denied the allegation, saying Cashman’s claim "makes no sense."

== Book Citations ==
McKinnis has been written about and referenced in four books: Michael Lewis's 2003 book, Moneyball; Paul Byrd's 2008 book, Free Byrd; R. A. Dickey's 2012 autobiography, Wherever I Wind Up: My Quest for Truth, Authenticity and the Perfect Knuckleball; and Shi Davidi's 2013 book, Great Expectations: The Lost Toronto Blue Jays Season.

In addition, McKinnis became the first sports agent to ever be featured in the Sporting News 125-year history in the column "On the Agent Side" in its January 17, 2011 issue.
