= Roger Lee King =

American engineer

Roger Lee King is an American engineer currently a William L. Giles Distinguished Professor at Mississippi State University and is an Elected Fellow at the IEEE.
