= Irig =

IRIG may mean:

- The Inter-Range Instrumentation Group, a standards publishing body
  - Inter-range instrumentation group time codes, the best known IRIG standards
- Irig, Serbia, a town and municipality in the Srem District of Vojvodina, Serbia
