= Time server =

Server that reads time information and distributes it

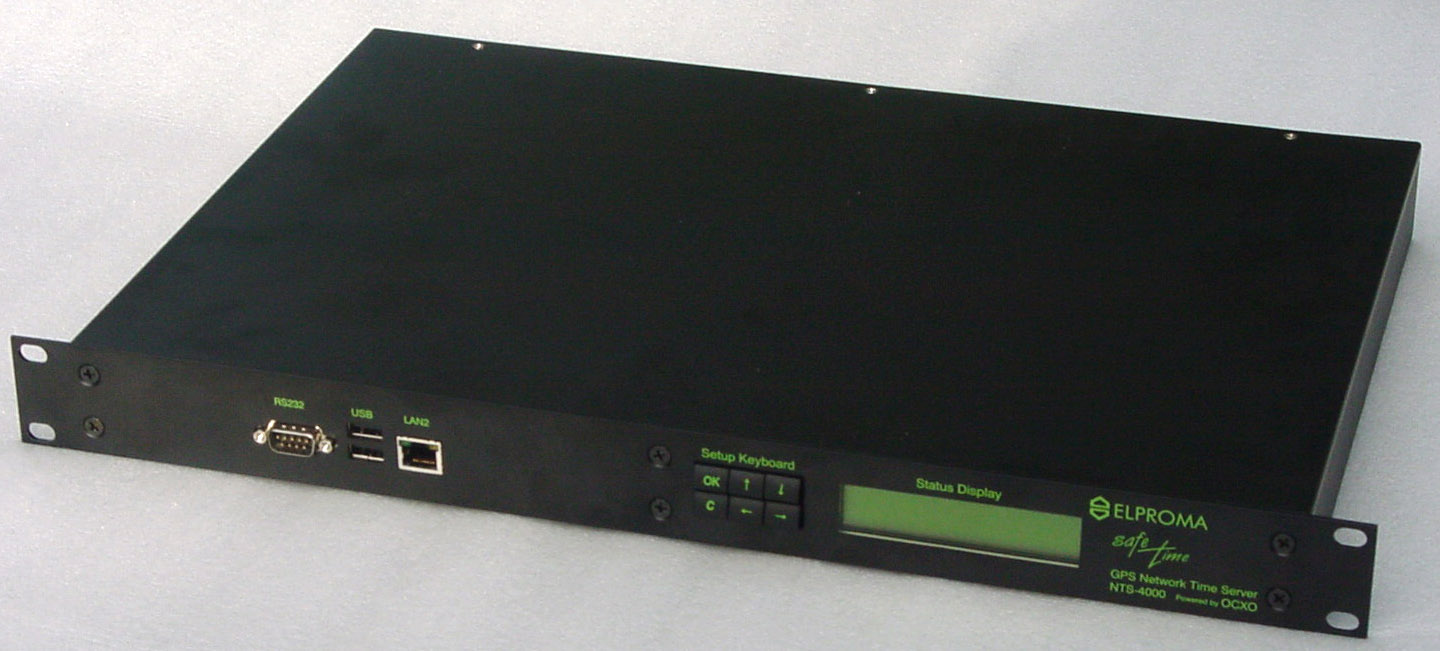
A typical commercial time server in rackmount form factor. (Elproma front panel).

A time server is a server computer that reads the actual time from a reference clock and distributes this information to its clients using a computer network. The time server may be a local network time server or an internet time server.

The most important and widely used protocol for distributing and synchronising time over the Internet is the Network Time Protocol (NTP), though other less-popular or outdated time protocols continue in use. A variety of protocols are in common use for sending time signals over radio links and serial connections.

The time reference used by a time server could be another time server on the network or the Internet, a connected radio clock or an atomic clock. The most common true time source is a GPS or GPS master clock. Time servers are sometimes multi-purpose network servers, dedicated network servers, or dedicated devices. All a dedicated time server does is provide accurate time.

An existing network server (e.g. a file server) can become a time server with additional software. The NTP homepage provides a free and widely used reference implementation of the NTP server and client for many popular operating systems. The other choice is a dedicated time server device.

The term "stratum" is used to label the closeness to a central or high quality time server. The stratum indicates the place of a particular time server in a hierarchy of servers. The scale is 1 to 15 where 1 is the most accurate and likely a highly specialized physical hardware device. Some time clients will reject a time update from a server whose stratum is too high, and most will prefer low strata time sources to higher ones. This can be a pitfall for administrators setting up an in-house time server with no true time source.

Commercial implementations of stratum-1 and stratum-2 servers are available from various manufacturers.

== See also ==
- Network Time Protocol
- Inter-range instrumentation group time codes (IRIG)
- IEEE 1344
- IEEE 1588
- NMEA 0183
