= Inter-Range Instrumentation Group =

The Inter-Range Instrumentation Group (IRIG) is the standards body of the Range Commanders Council (RCC). The group publishes standards through the RCC Secretariat at White Sands Missile Range.

The best known IRIG standard is the IRIG timecode used to timestamp video, film, telemetry, radar, and other data collected at test ranges.

The following radio time sources broadcast IRIG timecodes:

- BPM (China)
- CHU (Canada)
- WWV and WWVH (United States)

The RCC's IRIG Standard 106 is a comprehensive telemetry standard for aeronautical applications at RCC member ranges. Chapter 10 of Standard 106 governs digital flight data recorders. IRIG Standard 313-01 prescribes test standards for flight termination receivers.

== See also ==
Related topics

- Rocket range

Related technologies

- Specification of BBC phase-modulated transmissions on long-wave is a non-IRIG time signalling system that has many similarities to IRIG.
