= VNG (disambiguation) =

VNG or videonystagmography is a technology for testing inner ear and central motor functions.

VNG may also refer to:

- Radio VNG, Australia's national time signal service, now decommissioned
- Verbundnetz Gas AG, a natural gas company headquartered in Leipzig, Germany
- Vereniging van Nederlandse Gemeenten, the association of Dutch municipalities
- VNG Corporation (also known as Vinagame), a Vietnamese internet and social media company
