= Phasor measurement unit =

Device measuring electrical waves on a power grid

Using a PMU, it is simple to detect abnormal waveform shapes. A waveform shape described mathematically is called a phasor.

A phasor measurement unit (PMU) is a device used to estimate the magnitude and phase angle of an electrical phasor quantity (such as voltage or current) in the electricity grid using a common time source for synchronization. Time synchronization is usually provided by GPS or IEEE 1588 Precision Time Protocol, which allows synchronized real-time measurements of multiple remote points on the grid. PMUs are capable of capturing samples from a waveform in quick succession and reconstructing the phasor quantity, made up of an angle measurement and a magnitude measurement. The resulting measurement is known as a synchrophasor. These time synchronized measurements are important because if the grid’s supply and demand are not perfectly matched, frequency imbalances can cause stress on the grid, which is a potential cause for power outages.

PMUs can also be used to measure the frequency in the power grid. A typical commercial PMU can report measurements with very high temporal resolution, up to 120 measurements per second. This helps engineers in analyzing dynamic events in the grid which is not possible with traditional SCADA measurements that generate one measurement every 2 or 4 seconds. Therefore, PMUs equip utilities with enhanced monitoring and control capabilities and are considered to be one of the most important measuring devices in the future of power systems. A PMU can be a dedicated device, or the PMU function can be incorporated into a protective relay or other device.

== History ==
In 1893, Charles Proteus Steinmetz presented a paper on simplified mathematical description of the waveforms of alternating current electricity. Steinmetz called his representation a phasor. With the invention of phasor measurement units (PMU) in 1988 by Dr. Arun G. Phadke and Dr. James S. Thorp at Virginia Tech, Steinmetz’s technique of phasor calculation evolved into the calculation of real time phasor measurements that are synchronized to an absolute time reference provided by the Global Positioning System. We therefore refer to synchronized phasor measurements as synchrophasors. Early prototypes of the PMU were built at Virginia Tech, and Macrodyne built the first PMU (model 1690) in 1992. Today they are available commercially.

With the increasing growth of distributed energy resources on the power grid, more observability and control systems will be needed to accurately monitor power flow. Historically, power has been delivered in a uni-directional fashion through passive components to customers, but now that customers can generate their own power with technologies such as solar PV, this is changing into a bidirectional system for distribution systems. With this change it is imperative that transmission and distribution networks are continuously being observed through advanced sensor technology, such as ––PMUs and uPMUs.

In simple terms, the public electric grid that a power company operates was originally designed to take power from a single source: the operating company's generators and power plants, and feed it into the grid, where the customers consume the power. Now, some customers are operating power generating devices (solar panels, wind turbines, etc.) and to save costs (or to generate income) are also feeding power back into the grid. Depending on the region, feeding power back into the grid may be done through net metering. Because of this process, voltage and current must be measured and regulated in order to ensure the power going into the grid is of the quality and standard that customer equipment expects (as seen through metrics such as frequency, phase synchronicity, and voltage). If this is not done, as Rob Landley puts it, "people's light bulbs start exploding." This measurement function is what these devices do.

== Operation ==
A PMU can measure 50/60 Hz AC waveforms (voltages and currents) typically at a rate of 48 samples per cycle making them effective at detecting fluctuations in voltage or current at less than one cycle. However, when the frequency does not oscillate around or near 50/60 Hz, PMUs are not able to accurately reconstruct these waveforms. Phasor measurements from PMU’s are constructed from cosine waves, that follow the structure below.

$A\cos(\omega t + \theta)$

The A in this function is a scalar value, that is most often described as voltage or current magnitude (for PMU measurements). The θ is the phase angle offset from some defined starting position, and the ω is the angular frequency of the wave form (usually 2π50 radians/second or 2π60 radians/second). In most cases PMUs only measure the voltage magnitude and the phase angle, and assume that the angular frequency is a constant. Because this frequency is assumed constant, it is disregarded in the phasor measurement. PMU’s measurements are a mathematical fitting problem, where the measurements are being fit to a sinusoidal curve. Thus, when the waveform is non-sinusoidal, the PMU is unable to fit it exactly. The less sinusoidal the waveform is, such as grid behavior during a voltage sag or fault, the worse the phasor representation becomes.

The analog AC waveforms detected by the PMU are digitized by an analog-to-digital converter for each phase. A phase-locked oscillator along with a Global Positioning System (GPS) reference source provides the needed high-speed synchronized sampling with 1 microsecond accuracy. However, PMUs can take in multiple time sources including non-GPS references as long as they are all calibrated and working synchronously. The resultant time-stamped phasors can be transmitted to a local or remote receiver at rates up to 120 samples per second. Being able to see time synchronized measurements over a large area is helpful in examining how the grid operates at large, and determining which parts of the grid are affected by different disturbances.

Historically, only small numbers of PMUs have been used to monitor transmission lines with acceptable errors of around 1%. These were simply coarser devices installed to prevent catastrophic blackouts. Now, with the invention of micro-synchronous phasor technology, many more of them are desired to be installed on distribution networks where power can be monitored at a very high degree of precision. This high degree of precision creates the ability to drastically improve system visibility and implement smart and preventative control strategies. No longer are PMUs just required at sub-stations, but are required at several places in the network including tap-changing transformers, complex loads, and PV generation buses.

While PMUs are generally used on transmission systems, new research is being done on the effectiveness of micro-PMUs for distribution systems. Transmission systems generally have voltage that is at least an order of magnitude higher than distribution systems (between 12kV and 500kV while distribution runs at 12kV and lower). This means that transmission systems can have less precise measurements without compromising the accuracy of the measurement. However, distribution systems need more precision in order to improve accuracy, which is the benefit of uPMUs. uPMUs decrease the error of the phase angle measurements on the line from ±1° to ±0.05°, giving a better representation of the true angle value. The “micro” term in front of the PMU simply means it is a more precise measurement.

== Technical overview ==
A phasor is a complex number that represents both the magnitude and phase angle of the sine waves found in electricity. Phasor measurements that occur at the same time over any distance are called "synchrophasors". While it is commonplace for the terms "PMU" and "synchrophasor" to be used interchangeably they actually represent two separate technical meanings. A synchrophasor is the metered value whereas the PMU is the metering device. In typical applications, phasor measurement units are sampled from widely dispersed locations in the power system network and synchronized from the common time source of a Global Positioning System (GPS) radio clock. Synchrophasor technology provides a tool for system operators and planners to measure the state of the electrical system (over many points)and manage power quality.

PMUs measure voltages and currents at principal intersecting locations (critical substations) on a power grid and can output accurately time-stamped voltage and current phasors. Because these phasors are truly synchronized, synchronized comparison of two quantities is possible in real time. These comparisons can be used to assess system conditions-such as; frequency changes, MW, MVARs, kVolts, etc. The monitored points are preselected through various studies to make extremely accurate phase angle measurements to indicate shifts in system (grid) stability. The phasor data is collected either on-site or at centralized locations using Phasor Data Concentrator technologies. The data is then transmitted to a regional monitoring system which is maintained by the local Independent System Operator (ISO). These ISO's will monitor phasor data from individual PMU's or from as many as 150 PMU's — this monitoring provides an accurate means of establishing controls for power flow from multiple energy generation sources (nuclear, coal, wind, etc.).

The technology has the potential to change the economics of power delivery by allowing increased power flow over existing lines. Synchrophasor data could be used to allow power flow up to a line's dynamic limit instead of to its worst-case limit. Synchrophasor technology will usher in a new process for establishing centralized and selective controls for the flow of electrical energy over the grid. These controls will affect both large scale (multiple-states) and individual transmission line sections at intersecting substations. Transmission line congestion (over-loading), protection, and control will therefore be improved on a multiple region scale (US, Canada, Mexico) through interconnecting ISO's.

== Phasor networks ==
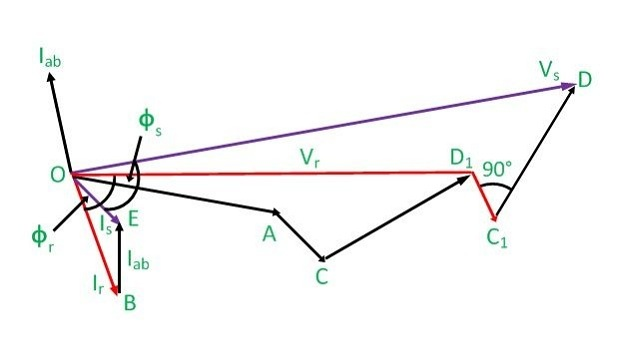
Phasor network representation showing the sending end voltage (Vs), receiving end voltage (Vr), and the current and phase angle relationships in a synchronized power system.

A phasor network consists of phasor measurement units (PMUs) dispersed throughout the electricity system, Phasor Data Concentrators (PDC) to collect the information and a Supervisory Control And Data Acquisition (SCADA) system at the central control facility. Such a network is used in Wide Area Measurement Systems (WAMS), the first of which began in 2000 by the Bonneville Power Administration. The complete network requires rapid data transfer within the frequency of sampling of the phasor data. GPS time stamping can provide a theoretical accuracy of synchronization better than 1 microsecond. "Clocks need to be accurate to ± 500 nanoseconds to provide the one microsecond time standard needed by each device performing synchrophasor measurement." For 60 Hz systems, PMUs must deliver between 10 and 30 synchronous reports per second depending on the application. The PDC correlates the data, and controls and monitors the PMUs (from a dozen up to 60). At the central control facility, the SCADA system presents system wide data on all generators and substations in the system every 2 to 10 seconds.

PMUs often use phone lines to connect to PDCs, which then send data to the SCADA or Wide Area Measurement System (WAMS) server. Additionally, PMUs can use ubiquitous mobile (cellular) networks for data transfer (GPRS, UMTS), which allows potential savings in infrastructure and deployment costs, at the expense of a larger data reporting latency. However, the introduced data latency makes such systems more suitable for R&D measurement campaigns and near real-time monitoring, and limits their use in real-time protective systems.

PMUs from multiple vendors can yield inaccurate readings. In one test, readings differed by 47 microseconds – or a difference of 1 degree of 60 Hz- an unacceptable variance. China's solution to the problem was to build all its own PMUs adhering to its own specifications and standards so there would be no multi-vendor source of conflicts, standards, protocols, or performance characteristics.

== Installation ==
Installation of a typical 10 Phasor PMU is a simple process. A phasor will be either a 3 phase voltage or a 3 phase current. Each phasor will, therefore, require 3 separate electrical connections (one for each phase). Typically an electrical engineer designs the installation and interconnection of a PMU at a substation or at a generation plant. Substation personnel will bolt an equipment rack to the floor of the substation following established seismic mounting requirements. Then the PMU along with a modem and other support equipment will be mounted on the equipment rack. They will also install the Global Positioning Satellite (GPS) antenna on the roof of the substation per manufacturer instructions. Substation personnel will also install "shunts" in all Current transformer (CT) secondary circuits that are to be measured. The PMU will also require communication circuit connection (Modem if using 4-wire connection or Ethernet for network connection).

== Implementations ==
- The Bonneville Power Administration (BPA) was the first utility to implement comprehensive adoption of synchrophasors in its wide-area monitoring system. This was in 2000, and today there are several implementations underway.
- The FNET project operated by Virginia Tech and the University of Tennessee utilizes a network of approximately 80 low-cost, high-precision Frequency Disturbance Recorders to collect syncrophasor data from the U.S. power grid.
- The New York Independent System Operator has installed 48 PMUs throughout New York State, partly in response to a devastating 2003 blackout that originated in Ohio and affected regions in both the United States and Canada.
- In 2006, China's Wide Area Monitoring Systems (WAMS) for its 6 grids had 300 PMUs installed mainly at 500 kV and 330 kV substations and power plants. By 2012, China plans to have PMUs at all 500kV substations and all powerplants of 300MW and above. Since 2002, China has built its own PMUs to its own national standard. One type has higher sampling rates than typical and is used in power plants to measure rotor angle of the generator, reporting excitation voltage, excitation current, valve position, and output of the power system stabilizer (PSS). All PMUs are connected via private network, and samples are received within 40 ms on average.
- The North American Synchrophasor Initiative (NASPI), previously known as The Eastern Interconnect Phasor Project (EIPP), has over 120 connected phasor measurement units collecting data into a "Super Phasor Data Concentrator" system centered at Tennessee Valley Authority (TVA). This data concentration system is now an open source project known as the openPDC.
- The DOE has sponsored several related research projects, including GridStat at Washington State University.
- ARPA-E has sponsored a related research project on Micro-Synchrophasors for Distribution Systems, at the University of California, Berkeley.
- The largest Wide Area Monitoring System in the world is in India. The Unified Real Time Dynamic State Measurement system (URTDSM) is composed of 1,950 PMUs installed in 351 substations feeding synchrophasor data to 29 State Control Centres, 5 Regional Control Centres and 2 National Control Centres.

== Applications ==
1. Power system automation, as in smart grids
2. Load shedding and other load control techniques such as demand response mechanisms to manage a power system. (i.e. Directing power where it is needed in real-time)
3. Increase the reliability of the power grid by detecting faults early, allowing for isolation of operative system, and the prevention of power outages.
4. Increase power quality by precise analysis and automated correction of sources of system degradation.
5. Wide area measurement and control through state estimation, in very wide area super grids, regional transmission networks, and local distribution grids.
6. Phasor measurement technology and synchronized time stamping can be used for Security improvement through synchronized encryptions like trusted sensing base. Cyber attack recognition by verifying data between the SCADA system and the PMU data.
7. Distribution State Estimation and Model Verification. Ability to calculate impedances of loads, distribution lines, verify voltage magnitude and delta angles based on mathematical state models.
8. Event Detection and Classification. Events such as various types of faults, tap changes, switching events, circuit protection devices. Machine learning and signal classification methods can be used to develop algorithms to identify these significant events.
9. Microgrid applications––islanding or deciding where to detach from the grid, load and generation matching, and resynchronization with the main grid.

== Standards ==
The IEEE 1344 standard for synchrophasors was completed in 1995, and reaffirmed in 2001. In 2005, it was replaced by IEEE C37.118-2005, which was a complete revision and dealt with issues concerning use of PMUs in electric power systems. The specification describes standards for measurement, the method of quantifying the measurements, testing & certification requirements for verifying accuracy, and data transmission format and protocol for real-time data communication. This standard was not comprehensive- it did not attempt to address all factors that PMUs can detect in power system dynamic activity. A new version of the standard was released in December 2011, which split the IEEE C37.118-2005 standard into two parts: C37.118-1 dealing with the phasor estimation & C37.118-2 the communications protocol. It also introduced two classifications of PMU, M — measurement & P — protection. M class is close in performance requirements to that in the original 2005 standard, primarily for steady state measurement. P class has relaxed some performance requirements and is intended to capture dynamic system behavior. An amendment to C37.118.1 was released in 2014. IEEE C37.118.1a-2014 modified PMU performance requirements that were not considered achievable.

Other standards used with PMU interfacing:

- OPC-DA / OPC-HDA — A Microsoft Windows based interface protocol that is currently being generalized to use XML and run on non Windows computers.
- IEC 61850 a standard for electrical substation automation
- BPA PDCStream — a variant of IEEE 1344 used by the Bonneville Power Administration (BPA) PDCs and user interface software.

== See also ==
- Utility frequency
- Power system automation
- Electric power transmission
- Smart grid
