= Yilu Liu =

Chinese-American electrical engineer

Yilu Liu is a Chinese-American electrical engineer. She is a leader in the development of the FNET GridEye monitoring system for the North American power grid, and is known for her research on electric power systems and smart grids.

Liu is UT-ORNL Governor’s Chair Professor of Electrical Engineering and Computer Science at the University of Tennessee, Deputy Director of the Center for Ultra-Wide-Area Resilient Electric Energy Transmission Networks (CURENT) at the University of Tennessee, and also holds an affiliation with the Oak Ridge National Laboratory. She is an IEEE Fellow and a member of the National Academy of Engineering.

== Education and career ==
Liu is a 1982 graduate of Xi'an Jiaotong University. She completed her Ph.D. in 1989 at the Ohio State University. She joined the Virginia Tech faculty in 1990, and was promoted to professor there in 2001. In 2009, she moved to the University of Tennessee as UT-ORNL Governor’s Chair Professor for Power Electronics.

== Recognition ==
Liu was named an IEEE Fellow in 2003. She was elected to the National Academy of Engineering in 2016, "for innovations in electric power grid monitoring, situational awareness, and dynamic modelling".

In 2020 the IEEE Power & Energy Society gave Liu their Wanda Reder Pioneer in Power Award, "for innovative contributions and leadership in synchrophasor-based wide area monitoring and control systems".
