= Radio VNG =

Australian national time signal service

Radio VNG was Australia's national time signal service. It was inaugurated by the Australian Post Office at Lyndhurst, Victoria on 21 September 1964, although a predecessor service using the callsign VLX had begun in March 1946 alongside shortwave radio station VLR. From 1964 until 1987, Radio VNG transmitted on 4.5, 7.5 and 12 MHz from the Lyndhurst transmitters. After 1987 it relocated to Shanes Park, NSW, and transmitted on 2.5, 5, 8.638, 12.984, and 16 MHz. It shut down in 2002.

== Signal properties ==
Radio VNG broadcast time in binary-coded decimal, during seconds 21–58. It also broadcast DUT-1 information during seconds 1-16. Tones were usually of 1 kHz. Encoding details are described in the VNG Leaflet (see Further Reading). Radio VNG also broadcast a spoken time signal every 15 minutes. The exact words in earlier years were:

"This is VNG Lyndhurst, Victoria, Australia on 4.5, 7.5 or 12 MHz. VNG is a standard frequency and time signal service of the Australian Telecommunications Commission. This is VNG Lyndhurst, Victoria, Australia on 4.5, 7.5 or 12 MHz."

If a leap second were to be introduced, a further voice announcement occurred.

== Historical ==
The original service (Lyndhurst) 38°03′03″S 145°15′44″E was shut down in October 1987, due to a lack of funding. The area has since been converted to housing estates with the only hints to the former site at Lyndhurst and the vast antenna arrays for VNG and other radio services ever existing is "Tower Hill Park" and a road called "Towerhill Boulevard". The original Lyndhust site was owned by the Commonwealth of Australia and the boundaries of the site were essentially a triangle shape formed by the South Gippsland Highway, Hallam Road and Lynbrook Boulevard.

The replacement Radio VNG service operated from 33°42′52″S 150°47′33″E, Shanes Park, Llandillo, NSW, until 30 June 2002 on 2.5 and 8.838 MHz. The remaining three transmitters (5, 12.984, and 16 MHz) were finally closed down on 31 December 2002.

== Currently available time signals ==
Many scientific and astronomical users of the service were somewhat inconvenienced with the shutdown of Radio VNG.

Daytime reception of overseas shortwave and longwave time signal services in Australia (and New Zealand) is rather poor as the nearest HF (and longwave) time signal services are BPM (China), JJY (Japan), WWVH (Hawaii, USA) and WWV (Colorado, USA).
