= Arun G. Phadke =

American academic

Arun Phadke is a University Distinguished Research Professor in the Department of Electrical and Computer Engineering at Virginia Tech. Along with fellow Virginia Tech professor James Thorp, Phadke received The Franklin Institute's 2008 Benjamin Franklin Medal in Electrical Engineering for their contributions to the power industry, particularly microprocessor controllers and Phasor measurement unit (PMU) technology in electric power systems.

== Selected publications ==
- Textbook: Computer Relaying for Power Systems (Arun G. Phadke and J. S. Thorp (Research Studies Press))
- Research monograph : Synchronized Phasor Measurements and Their Applications, (Arun G. Phadke and J.S. Thorp (Springer))
- Textbook: Handbook of Electrical Engineering Calculations (ed. Arun G. Phadke (Marcel Dekker))
- Textbook: Power System Relaying (Arun G. Phadke and Stanley H. Horowitz (John Wiley & Sons))
