= FNET =

Power grid frequency measurement system

FNET (Frequency monitoring Network; a.k.a. FNET/GridEye, GridEye) is a wide-area power system frequency measurement system. Using a type of phasor measurement unit (PMU) known as a frequency disturbance recorder (FDR), FNET/GridEye is able to measure the power system frequency, voltage, and angle very accurately. These measurements can then be used to study various power system phenomena, and may play an important role in the development of future smart grid technologies. The FNET/GridEye system is currently operated by the Power Information Technology Laboratory at the University of Tennessee (UTK) in Knoxville, Tennessee, and Oak Ridge National Laboratory (ORNL) in Oak Ridge, Tennessee.

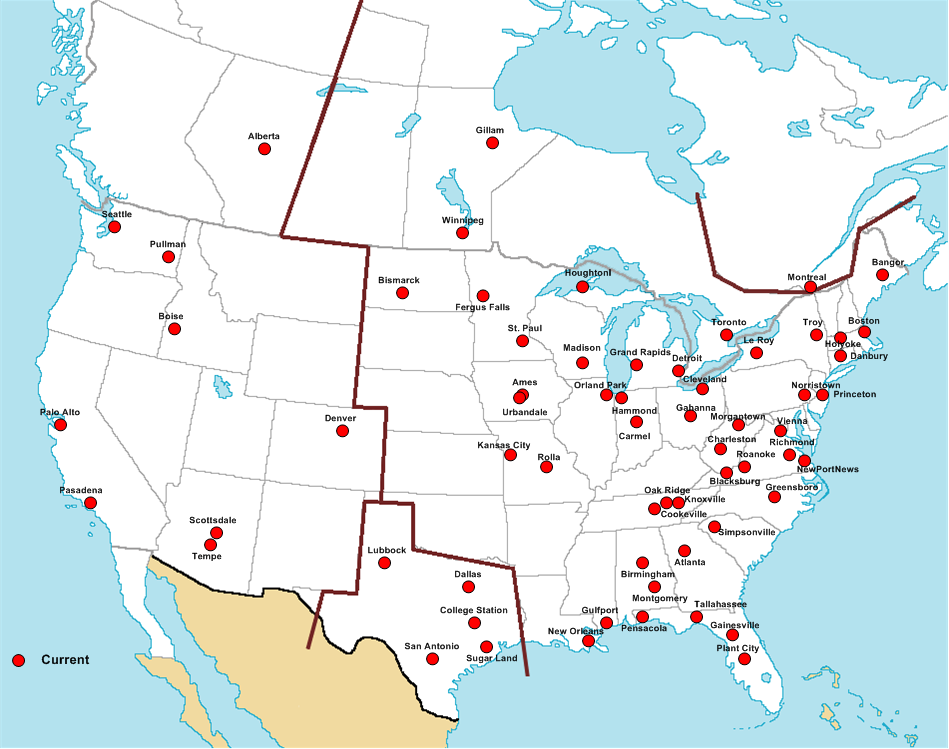
FNET FDR locations as of September, 2010

== History ==
A phasor measurement unit is an important tool that is used to monitor and study electric power systems. The first PMUs were developed at Virginia Tech in the late 1980s. These devices measure the voltage, frequency and phase angle at buses within the power system. By utilizing the Global Positioning System, a PMU can provide a timestamp for each measurement. This allows measurements taken from different PMUs to be accurately compared.

A PMU is typically installed at an electrical substation. This process can be quite expensive and time-consuming, costing tens of thousands of dollars per device and requiring several months of effort. The high cost of installing PMUs has limited their use in the electric power industry.

In 2000, researchers led by Virginia Tech faculty member Yilu Liu began the development of a low-cost phasor measurement network that could be installed at the low-voltage distribution level of the power grid. Researchers at Virginia Tech received a NSF MRI grant from the National Science Foundation to develop the system, which became known as FNET. The first frequency disturbance recorder was developed in 2003 with support from TVA (Tennessee Valley Authority) and ABB. The FNET system went online in 2004.

Since 2010, in partnership with the Department of Energy (DOE), FNET/GridEye has been developed into a wide-area grid monitoring network that covers the three major North American power grids and 16 of the largest grids around the world.

== Frequency disturbance recorder ==
The frequency disturbance recorder, or FDR, is a GPS-synchronized single-phase PMU that is installed at ordinary 120 V outlets. Because the voltages involved are much lower than those of a typical three-phase PMU, the device is relatively inexpensive and simple to install.

The FDR works by rapidly sampling (1,440 times per second) a scaled-down version of the outlet’s voltage signal using an analog-to-digital converter. These samples are then processed via an onboard digital signal processor, which computes the instantaneous phase angle of the voltage signal for each sample. The device then computes the voltage angle, frequency and voltage magnitude at 100 ms intervals. Each measurement is time stamped using the information provided by the GPS system and then transmitted to the FNET/GridEye server for processing and storage. The frequency measurements obtained from the FDR are accurate to within ± 0.0005 Hz and angle accuracy could reach 0.02 degree.

An FDR requires only a power outlet, Ethernet port and a view of the sky (for the GPS antenna). Thus, FDRs can be installed virtually anywhere, including substations, offices, and even private residences.

== System architecture ==
Currently, FNET/GridEye collects data from over 300 FDRs, most of which are installed in the North American power grid. About 70 of these units are located in 30 of the other largest grids around the world.

The FDRs transmit their measurements over the Internet to phasor data concentrators (PDCs) located at the University of Tennessee and Oak Ridge National Lab. These PDCs collect more than 4 GB of phasor data per day. The PDCs also forward data to an application server that performs near-real-time analysis of the data. Examples of the analysis applications are given below.

== Applications ==
A variety of applications have been developed using the FNET/GridEye platform. Some operate in near-real-time, while others are used for offline analysis.

=== Event detection and location ===
The sudden addition or removal of large amounts of load or generation in a power system leads to changes in frequency. For example, a generator trip causes a decline in frequency, whereas load shedding results in an increase in frequency. The change in frequency is proportional to the size of the tripped generator or the amount of load shed. These changes propagate in both space and time throughout the grid. Since the geographical location of each FDR is known, as is the time of each measurement, it is possible to estimate both the size and location of these events.

=== Visualization ===
The FDR data can be used to "replay" power system events through intuitive animations. Both frequency and angle data can be used for this purpose.

=== Oscillation detection ===
Power system oscillations can occur as the result of generator trips, load shedding or faults, though some have no obvious cause. Such oscillations are usually not harmful, provided they are quickly and sufficiently damped. FNET/GridEye uses both the phase angle and frequency data to detect oscillations and provide real-time alerts.

=== Inter-area oscillation modal analysis ===
Once an oscillation has been detected, the system can perform modal analysis using the multichannel matrix pencil technique. This analysis reveals the dominant oscillation modes and shows which parts of the power grid tend to oscillate together. Recent studies showed some time-frequency analysis methods are useful for multi-channel mode analysis, such as multivariate empirical mode decomposition methods.

=== On-line trip detection ===
Line trip is one of the general disturbances in the power system. The outage of transmission lines affects the frequency and voltage stabilities of the system. By utilizing the measurement data in FNET system, the line trip events can be detected correctly and efficiently. The current project primarily focuses on the design of a professional line trip adaptor to realize the online line trip detection and to provide automatic alert notification for the clients.

=== Off grid/islanding detection ===
Based on the measurement data acquired by the FDRs deployed in the North American power grids, an islanding detection method is proposed and implemented. This method monitors the critical electrical loads and detects the transition of these loads from an on-grid operation to an islanding operation and also the transition from islanding back to on-grid operation.

== See also ==
- Electric power transmission
- Frequency estimation
- Phasor (sine waves)
- Phasor measurement unit
- Utility frequency
- Smart Grid
- Global Positioning System
- Wide area synchronous grid
