= James Thorp =

American engineer (1937–2018)

James S. Thorp (February 7, 1937 – May 2, 2018) was the head of the Bradley Department of Electrical and Computer Engineering at Virginia Tech. He was the Hugh P. and Ethel C. Kelly Professor Emeritus & Research Professor. He received all of his degrees (B.S. 1959, M.S. 1961, and Ph.D. 1962) from Cornell University. Professor Thorp was a teacher, a researcher, and for many years served as the director, in the School of Electrical and Computer Engineering at Cornell, where he worked from 1962 to 2004.

Along with fellow Virginia Tech professor Arun G. Phadke, Thorp received The Franklin Institute's 2008 Benjamin Franklin Medal in Electrical Engineering for their contributions to the power industry, particularly microprocessor controllers in electric power systems that have significantly decreased the occurrence and duration of power blackouts. He was elected to the National Academy of Engineering in 1996 for his "contributions to the development of digital techniques for power system protection, monitoring, and control" and also was an IEEE Fellow (since 1989).
