= WWV (radio station) =

American shortwave time signal radio station

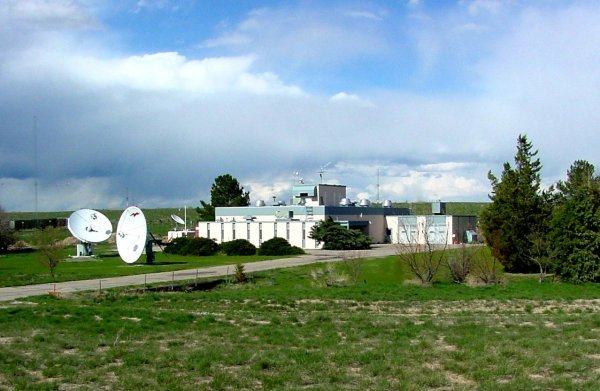
WWV Transmitter Building (2002 or earlier)

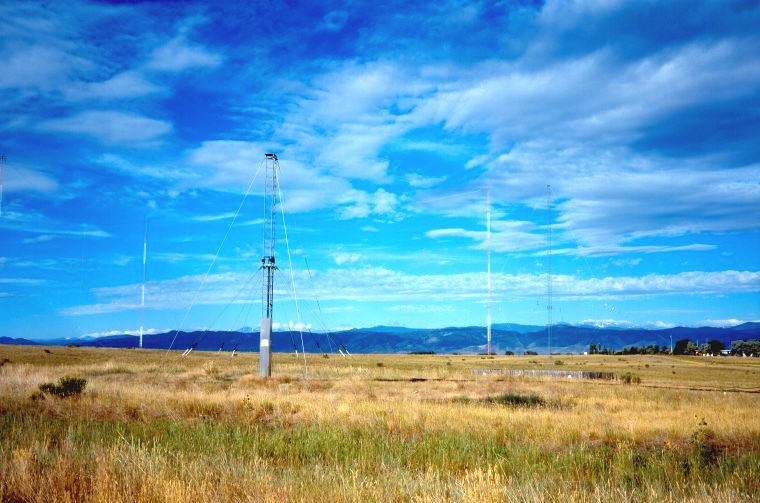
WWV's 15 MHz antenna

WWV is a shortwave ("high frequency" or HF) radio station, located near Fort Collins, Colorado. It has broadcast a continuous time signal since 1945, and implements United States government frequency standards, with transmitters operating on 2.5, 5, 10, 15, 20, and 25 MHz. WWV is operated by the U.S. National Institute of Standards and Technology (NIST), under the oversight of its Time and Frequency Division, which is part of NIST's Physical Measurement Laboratory based in Gaithersburg, Maryland. The letters WWV are only a call sign and do not stand for anything (see below).

WWV was established in 1919 by the Bureau of Standards in Washington, D.C., making it one of the oldest continuously-operating radio stations in the United States. NIST celebrated WWV's centennial on October 1, 2019.

In 1931, the station relocated to the first of three suburban Maryland sites, before moving to a location near Fort Collins in 1966. WWV shares this site with longwave (also known as "low frequency" or LF) station WWVB, which transmits carrier and time code (no voice) at 60 kHz. NIST also operates shortwave station WWVH on Kauai, Hawaii. Both WWV and WWVH announce the time of day each minute in Coordinated Universal Time, and make other recorded announcements of general interest on an hourly schedule, including the Global Positioning System (GPS) satellite constellation status. Because they simultaneously transmit on the same frequencies, WWV uses a male voice in order to differentiate itself from WWVH, which uses a female voice.

== Service ==
WWV sample time signal
WWV's time signal, as broadcast from 14:59:52 to 15:02:01 UTC on 4 September 2009.

Since 1945, WWV has disseminated "official U.S. time" provided by government entities NIST and the United States Naval Observatory (USNO), to ensure that uniform time is maintained throughout the United States and around the world. WWV provides a public service by making time information freely available at all hours.

The time signals generated by WWV allow time-keeping devices such as radio-controlled clocks, weather stations and wristwatches to automatically maintain accurate time without the need for manual adjustment. These time signals are used by commercial and institutional interests where accurate time plays a vital role in daily operations including shipping, transport, technology, research, education, military, public safety and telecommunications. It is of particular importance in broadcasting, whether it be commercial, public, or private interests such as amateur radio operators, who use the station's transmissions to test their equipment.

=== Transmission system ===
WWV antenna coordinates (WGS84)
| 2.5 MHz | 40°40′55.0″N 105°2′33.6″W |
| 5 MHz | 40°40′41.9″N 105°2′27.2″W |
| 10 MHz | 40°40′47.7″N 105°2′27.4″W |
| 15 MHz | 40°40′44.8″N 105°2′26.9″W |
| 20 MHz | 40°40′52.8″N 105°2′30.9″W |
| 25 MHz | 40°40′50.8″N 105°2′32.6″W |

WWV broadcasts over six transmitters, each one dedicated to a single frequency. The transmitting frequencies and time signals of WWV, WWVB and WWVH, along with the four atomic (cesium) clocks from which their time signals are derived, are maintained by NIST's Time and Frequency Division, which is based in nearby Boulder, Colorado. WWVB's carrier frequency is maintained to an accuracy of 1 part in 10^{14} and can be used as a frequency reference. The broadcast time is accurate to within 100 ns of UTC and 20 ns of the national time standard.

Recording of the WWV station on shortwave at the frequency of 10 MHz made on May 30, 2022. At minute 4:37 the ionospheric tests that WWV has conducted since the end of 2021 can be heard.

The transmitters for 2.5 MHz and 20 MHz have an ERP of 2.5 kW, while those for the other three frequencies use 10 kW of ERP. Each transmitter has a dedicated antenna, with a height corresponding to one-half of its wavelength, and an omnidirectional signal radiation pattern. The top half of each antenna tower has a quarter-wavelength radiating element, and the bottom half uses nine guy wires, connected to the midpoint of the tower and sloped at one-to-one from the ground—with a length of √2/4 times the wavelength—as additional radiating elements.

=== Telephone service ===
WWV's time signal can be accessed by telephone by calling +1 (303) 499-7111 (WWV). Telephone calls are limited to 2 minutes, and the signal is delayed by an average of 30 milliseconds due to telephone network propagation time.

== History ==
=== Establishment ===
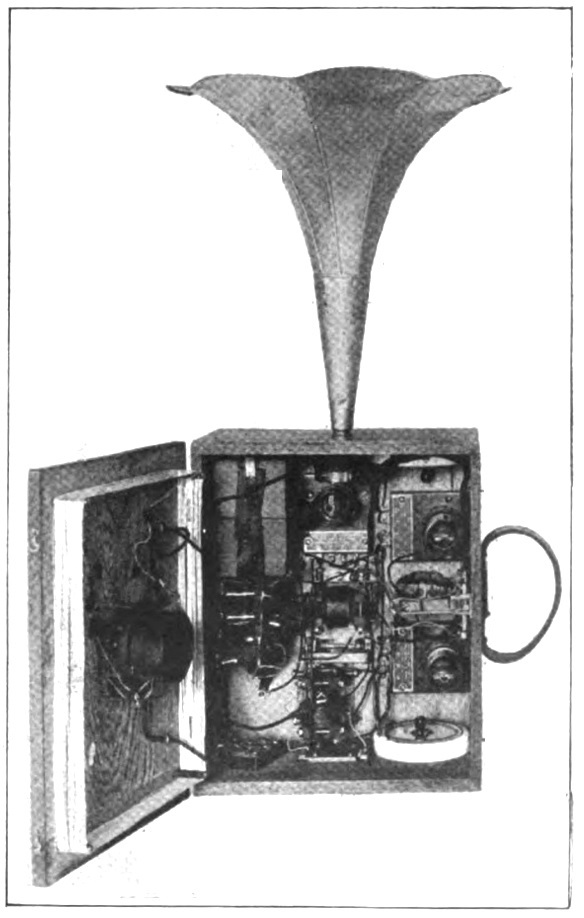
Alongside weekly broadcasts over WWV, in May 1920 the Bureau of Standards presented the "portaphone", with which one could "receive wireless impulses in the form of signals, music or speech, reproducing the same through a loud-speaking telephone and horn".

The earliest formal record of WWV's existence is in the October 1, 1919 issue of the Department of Commerce's Radio Service Bulletin, where it was listed as a new "experimental station" assigned to the Bureau of Standards in Washington, D.C., with the randomly issued call letters of WWV. However, there were also earlier reports of radio demonstrations by the Bureau, starting the previous February.

As of May 1920 the Bureau's Radio Laboratory was reported to be conducting weekly Friday evening concerts from 8:30 to 11:00, transmitting on 600 kHz. That same month, the Bureau demonstrated a portable radio receiver, called the "portaphone", which was said to be capable of receiving broadcast programs up to 15 miles (24 km) away. A newspaper article the following August reported that the weekly concerts could be heard up to 100 miles (160 km) from Washington. It also noted that "The bureau has been experimenting with the wireless music for several months, and has reached such an advanced stage of development that further investigation to them is useless, and they are going to discontinue the concerts." However, the station continued to make occasional broadcasts, and in January 1921 a new distance record was announced when a listener in Chattanooga, Tennessee reported hearing the "jazzy waves whirling out from the Bureau of Standards".

On December 15, 1920, WWV began broadcasting 500-word "Daily Radio Marketgrams", prepared by the U.S. Bureau of Markets, in Morse code on 750 kHz, which reportedly could be heard up to 200 miles (320 km) from Washington. However, on April 15, 1921 responsibility for the reports was transferred to four stations operated by the Post Office Department, including its WWX in Washington, D.C.

=== Standard frequency transmissions ===
At the end of 1922, WWV's purpose shifted to broadcasting standard frequency signals. These were an important aid to broadcasting and amateur stations, because their equipment limitations at the time meant they had difficulty staying on their assigned frequencies. Testing began on January 29, 1923. Regularly scheduled operations began on March 6, 1923, consisting of seven transmitting frequencies ranging from 550 to 1,500 kHz (wavelengths of 545 to 200 meters). The frequencies were accurate to "better than three-tenths of one percent". At first, the transmitter had to be manually switched from one frequency to the next, using a wavemeter. The first quartz resonators (that stabilized the frequency generating oscillators) were invented in the mid-1920s, and they greatly improved the accuracy of WWV's frequency broadcasts.

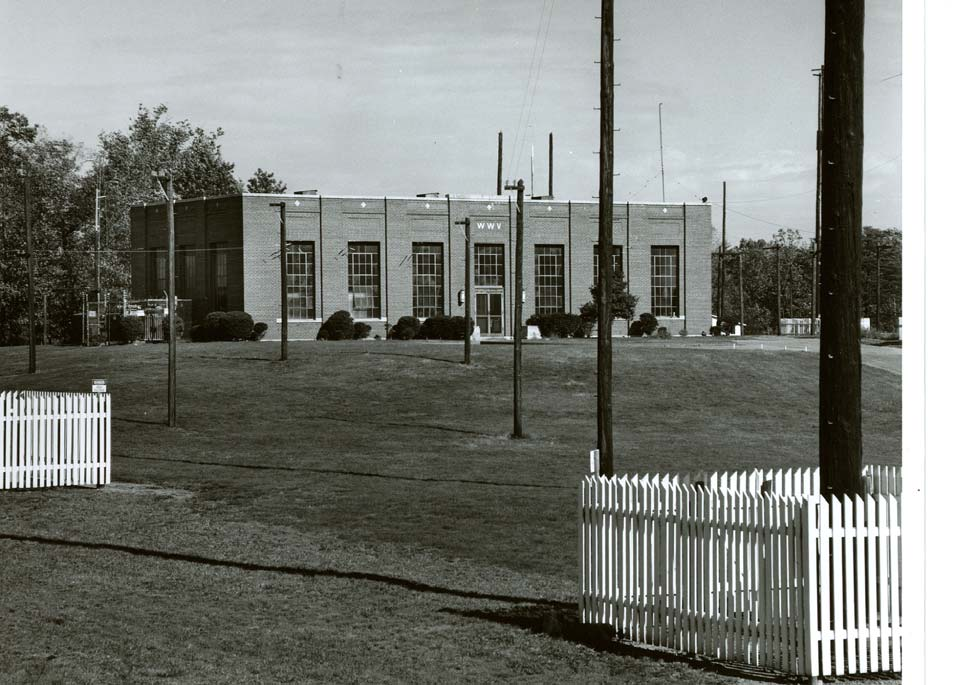
One of the Beltsville transmitter buildings (1943–1966)

In 1926, WWV was nearly shut down. Its signal could only cover the eastern half of the United States, and other stations located in Minneapolis and at Stanford University and the Massachusetts Institute of Technology were slowly making WWV redundant. The station's impending shutdown was announced in 1926, but it was saved by a flood of protests from citizens who relied on the service. Later, in 1931, WWV underwent an upgrade. Its transmitter, now directly controlled by a quartz oscillator, was moved to College Park, Maryland. Broadcasts began on 5 MHz. A year later, the station was moved again, to Department of Agriculture land in Beltsville, Maryland. Broadcasts were added on 10 and 15 MHz, power was increased, and time signals, an A440 tone, and ionosphere reports were all added to the broadcast in June 1937.

WWV was nearly destroyed by a fire on November 6, 1940. The frequency and transmitting equipment was recovered, and the station was back on the air (with reduced power) on November 11. Congress funded a new station in July 1941, and it was built 5 kilometres (3.1 mi) south of the former location, still referred to as Beltsville (although in 1961 the name used for the transmitter location would be changed to Greenbelt, Maryland). WWV resumed normal broadcasts on 2.5, 5, 10, and 15 MHz on August 1, 1943.

=== Time signal transmissions ===
Beginning in 1913 the primary official time station broadcasting in the eastern United States was the Navy's NAA in Arlington, Virginia. NAA was decommissioned in 1941. WWV began broadcasting second pulses in 1937, but these were not initially synchronized to actual time. In June 1944, the United States Naval Observatory allowed WWV to use the USNO clock as a source for its time signals. Over a year later, in October 1945, WWV broadcast Morse code time announcements every five minutes. Voice announcements started on January 1, 1950, and were broadcast every five minutes. Audio frequencies of 600 Hz and 440 Hz were employed during alternating minutes. By this time, WWV was broadcasting on 2.5, 5, 10, 15, 20, 25, 30, and 35 MHz. The 30 and 35 MHz broadcasts ended in 1953.

A binary-coded decimal time code began testing in 1960, and became permanent in 1961. This "NASA time code" was modulated onto a 1 kHz audio tone at 100 Hz, sounding somewhat like a monotonous repeated "baaga-bong". The code was also described as sounding like a "buzz-saw". On July 1, 1971, the time code's broadcast was changed to 100 Hz subcarrier, which is inaudible when using a normal radio (but can be heard using headphones or recorded using a chart recorder).

WWV moved to a location near Fort Collins on December 1, 1966, enabling better reception of its signal throughout the continental United States. WWVB had signed on in that location three years earlier. In April 1967, WWV stopped using the local time of the transmitter site (Eastern Time until 1966, and Mountain Time afterwards) and switched to broadcasting Greenwich Mean Time or GMT. The station switched again, to Coordinated Universal Time (UTC), in 1974.

The 20 and 25 MHz broadcasts were discontinued in 1977, but the 20 MHz broadcast was reinstated the next year. Starting on April 4, 2014, the 25 MHz signal was back on the air in an 'experimental' mode.

The voice used on WWV was that of professional broadcaster Don Elliott Heald until August 13, 1991, when equipment changes required re-recording the voice of another professional broadcaster, John Doyle, but was soon switched to the voice of KSFO morning host Lee Rodgers. Since then John Doyle's voice has been returned to the broadcast.

WWV, along with WWVB and WWVH, was recommended for defunding and elimination in NIST's Fiscal Year 2019 budget request. However, the final 2019 NIST budget preserved funding for the three stations.

=== WWV and Sputnik ===
WWV's 20 MHz signal was used for a unique purpose in 1958: to track the disintegration of Russian satellite Sputnik 1 after the craft's onboard electronics failed. John D. Kraus, a professor at Ohio State University, knew that a meteor entering the upper atmosphere leaves in its wake a small amount of ionized air. This air reflects a stray radio signal back to Earth, strengthening the signal at the surface for a few seconds. This effect is known as meteor scatter. Kraus figured that what was left of Sputnik would exhibit the same effect, but on a larger scale. His prediction was correct; WWV's signal was noticeably strengthened for a duration lasting over a minute. The strengthening came from a direction and at a time of day that agreed with predictions of the paths of Sputnik's last orbits. Using this information, Kraus was able to draw up a complete timeline of Sputnik's disintegration. In particular, he observed that satellites do not fall as one unit; instead, the spacecraft broke up into its component parts as it moved closer to Earth.

== Broadcast format ==
On top of the standard carrier frequencies, WWV carries additional information using standard double-sideband amplitude modulation. WWV's transmissions follow a regular pattern repeating each minute; the pattern is coordinated with that of its sister station WWVH to limit interference between them. Because they are so similar, both are described here.

WWV/WWVH minute format
| Second | WWV | WWVH |
|---|---|---|
| 0–1 | Minute beep (0.8 s) | |
| 1–45 | Standard tone or voice announcement | |
| 45–52.5 | Silence (except tick) | Voice time announcement |
| 52.5–60 | Voice time announcement | Silence (except tick) |

=== Date and time ===
WWV transmits the date and exact time as follows:

1. English-language voice announcements of time.
2. Binary-coded decimal time code of date and time, transmitted as varying length pulses of 100 Hz tone, one bit per second.

In both cases the transmitted time is given in Coordinated Universal Time (UTC).

=== Per-second ticks and minute markers ===
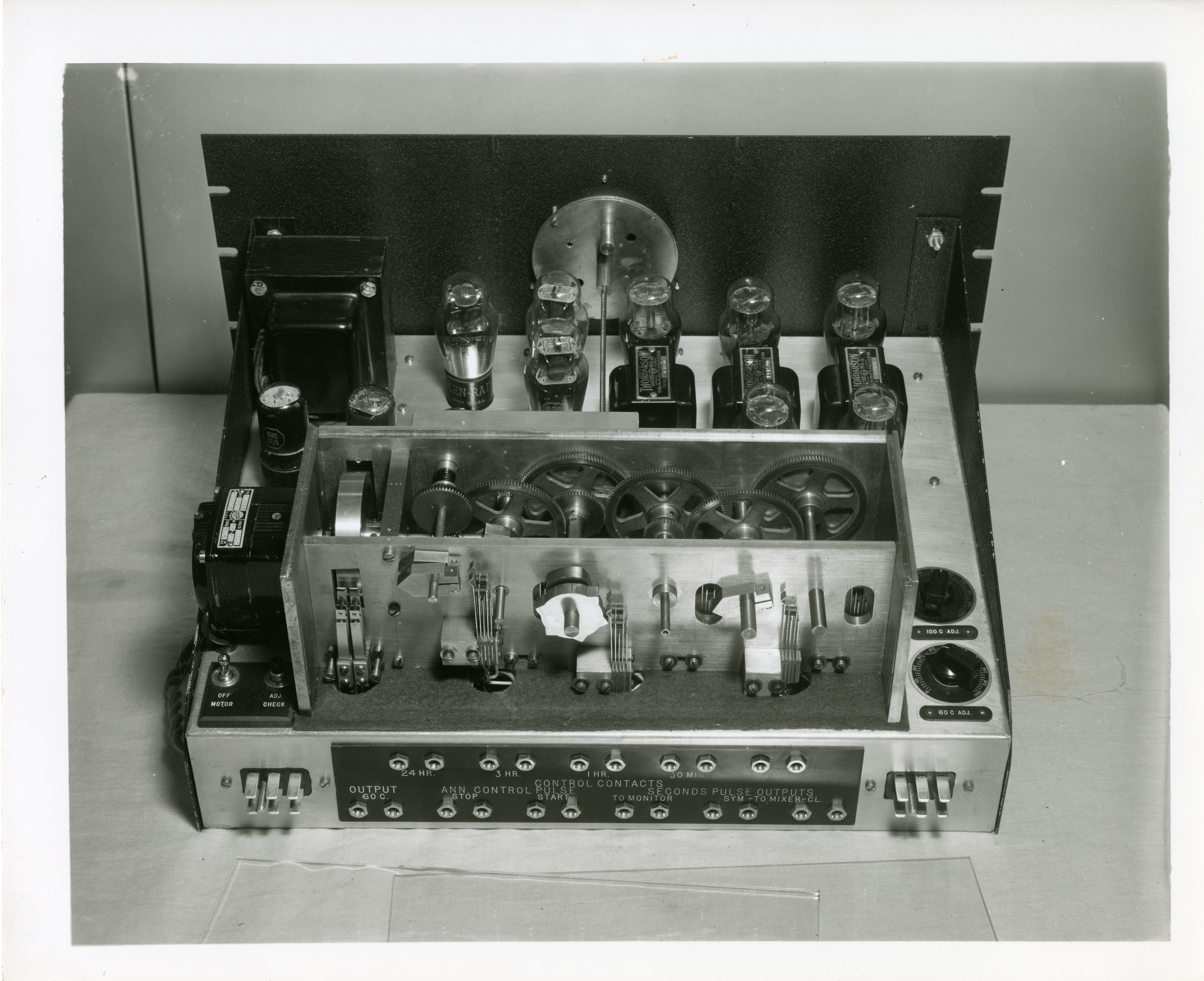
WWV seconds pulse generator, 1943

A 1,000 Hz tone

A 1,200 Hz tone

A 1,500 Hz tone

WWV transmits audio "ticks" once per second, to allow for accurate manual clock synchronization. These ticks are always transmitted, even during voice announcements and silent periods. Each tick begins on the second, lasts 5 ms and consists of 5 cycles of a 1,000 Hz sine wave. To make the tick stand out more, all other signals are suppressed for 40 ms, from 10 ms before the second until 30 ms after (25 ms after the tick). As an exception, no tick (and no silent interval) is transmitted at 29 or 59 seconds past the minute. Prior to the abolition of the leap second in 2026, when one occurred, no tick would be transmitted during second 60 of the minute.

On the minute, the tick is extended to a 0.8 second long beep, followed by 0.2 s of silence. On the hour, this minute pulse is transmitted at 1,500 Hz rather than 1,000 Hz. The beginning of the tone corresponds to the start of the minute.

Between seconds one and sixteen inclusive past the minute, the current difference between UTC and UT1 is transmitted by doubling some of the once-per-second ticks, transmitting a second tick 100 ms after the first. (The second tick preempts other transmissions, but does not get a silent zone.) The absolute value of this difference, in tenths of a second, is determined by the number of doubled ticks. The sign is determined by the position; if the doubled ticks begin at second one, UT1 is ahead of UTC; if they begin at second nine, UT1 is behind UTC.

WWVH transmits similar 5 ms ticks, but they are sent as 6 cycles of 1,200 Hz. The minute beep is also 1,200 Hz, except on the hour, when it is 1,500 Hz.

The ticks and minute tones are transmitted at 100% modulation (−3 dBc for both sidebands).

=== Voice time announcements ===
Voice announcements of time of day are made at the end of every minute, giving the time of the following minute beep. The format for the voice announcement is, "At the tone, X hour(s), Y minute(s), Coordinated Universal Time." The announcement is in a male voice and begins 7.5 seconds before the minute tone.

WWVH makes an identical time announcement, starting 15 seconds before the minute tone, in a female voice.

When voice announcements were first instituted, they were phrased as: "National Bureau of Standards, WWV; when the tone returns, Eastern Standard Time is [time in 12-hour format, e.g. four ten p.m.]" followed by 4-digit GMT sent in Morse code. After the 1967 switch to GMT, the announcement changed to "National Bureau of Standards, WWV, Fort Collins, Colorado; next tone begins at X hours, Y minute(s), Greenwich Mean Time." However, this format would be short-lived. The announcement was changed again to the current format in 1971. "At the tone, X hour(s), Y minute(s), Greenwich Mean Time." The name "Greenwich Mean Time" was changed to "Coordinated Universal Time" in 1974.

Voice time announcements are sent at 75% modulation (−1.25 dBc), i.e., the carrier varies between 25% and 175% of nominal power.

=== Other voice announcements ===
WWV transmits 44-second official announcements from various government departments (in lieu of the standard frequency tones) on an hourly schedule:

- A station identification at :00 and :30 past each hour;
- At :04 past the hour (:03 for WWVH), NIST broadcasts any announcements regarding a manual change in the operation of WWV and WWVH, such as leap second announcements. As of 2023, NIST is currently broadcasting a description of the experimental signal being sent at :08.
- At :08 past the hour (:48 for WWVH), some special atmospheric propagation test signals are broadcast, consisting of "several seconds each of Gaussian white noise, chirps varying up and down in frequency, and tones varying in amplitude, frequency and length." This signal began on 15 November 2021.
- At :18 past, a special "geophysical alert" report from the National Oceanic and Atmospheric Administration is transmitted, containing information on solar activity and shortwave radio propagation conditions. Here is an example of this announcement from May 24, 2018 at 0905 UTC:
  Solar-terrestrial indices for 23 May follow. Solar flux 73 and estimated planetary A-index 9. The estimated planetary K-index at 0900 UTC on 24 May was 1. No space weather storms were observed for the past 24 hours. No space weather storms are predicted for the next 24 hours."
- At :47 and :52, WWVH (only) broadcasts an announcement about the telephone time service.

Additional time slots are normally transmitted as a standard frequency tone, but can be preempted by voice messages if necessary:

- At :10 past the hour WWV transmits a Department of Defense message if any exists; WWVH does the same at :50 past the hour.
- :16 minutes past the hour is used for additional NIST announcements, if necessary.

WWVH transmits the same information on a different schedule. WWV and WWVH's voice announcements are timed to avoid crosstalk; WWV airs dead air when WWVH airs voice announcements, and vice versa.

Announcements formerly carried by WWV, but now discontinued, include:

- Marine storm warnings, provided by the National Weather Service, for the Atlantic Ocean at :08 and :09 minutes past the hour, for the Pacific Ocean at :10 past, with :11 past available for additional warnings if necessary. WWVH's storm warnings were broadcast from :48 to :51, and covered the area around the Hawaiian islands and the Far East rather than North America. WWV and WWVH discontinued all weather content on February 7, 2019, and the time slots they previously occupied are now classified as "NIST Reserved."
- At :14 and :15 past, GPS satellite health reports from the Coast Guard Navigation Center (:43 and :44 for WWVH).
- Prior to the shutdown of the OMEGA navigation system in 1997, an OMEGA status report was broadcast at :16 past the hour.
- There was a proposal to discontinue the geophysical alerts on September 6, 2011. However, as of June 17, 2011, WWV announced that the decision has been retracted and that the geophysical alert reports "will continue for the foreseeable future".

WWV/WWVH hourly schedule Second ticks are transmitted over top of signals listed here.
| Minute | WWV | WWVH | Minute | WWV | WWVH | Minute | WWV | WWVH |
| 00 | Station identification | Silence | 20 | 500 Hz | 600 Hz | 40 | 500 Hz | 600 Hz |
| 01 | 600 Hz | 440 Hz | 21 | 600 Hz | 500 Hz | 41 | 600 Hz | 500 Hz |
| 02 | 440 Hz | 600 Hz | 22 | 500 Hz | 600 Hz | 42 | 500 Hz | 600 Hz |
| 03 | Silence | NIST announcements | 23 | 600 Hz | 500 Hz | 43 | Silence | 500 Hz |
| 04 | NIST announcements | Silence | 24 | 500 Hz | 600 Hz | 44 | Silence | 600 Hz |
| 05 | 600 Hz | 500 Hz | 25 | 600 Hz | 500 Hz | 45 | Silence | Geophysical alerts |
| 06 | 500 Hz | 600 Hz | 26 | 500 Hz | 600 Hz | 46 | Silence | 600 Hz |
| 07 | 600 Hz | 500 Hz | 27 | 600 Hz | 500 Hz | 47 | Silence | NIST announcements |
| 08 | Scientific modulation | Silence | 28 | 500 Hz | 600 Hz | 48 | Silence | Scientific modulation |
| 09 | 600 Hz | Silence | 29 | Silence | Station identification | 49 | Silence | (NIST reserved) |
| 10 | (NIST reserved) | Silence | 30 | Station identification | Silence | 50 | Silence | (NIST reserved) |
| 11 | 600 Hz | 500 Hz | 31 | 600 Hz | 500 Hz | 51 | Silence | (NIST reserved) |
| 12 | 500 Hz | 600 Hz | 32 | 500 Hz | 600 Hz | 52 | Silence | NIST announcements |
| 13 | 600 Hz | 500 Hz | 33 | 600 Hz | 500 Hz | 53 | 600 Hz | 500 Hz |
| 14 | 500 Hz | 600 Hz | 34 | 500 Hz | 600 Hz | 54 | 500 Hz | 600 Hz |
| 15 | 600 Hz | Silence | 35 | 600 Hz | 500 Hz | 55 | 600 Hz | 500 Hz |
| 16 | 500 Hz | Silence | 36 | 500 Hz | 600 Hz | 56 | 500 Hz | 600 Hz |
| 17 | 600 Hz | Silence | 37 | 600 Hz | 500 Hz | 57 | 600 Hz | 500 Hz |
| 18 | Geophysical alerts | Silence | 38 | 500 Hz | 600 Hz | 58 | 500 Hz | 600 Hz |
| 19 | 600 Hz | Silence | 39 | 600 Hz | 500 Hz | 59 | Silence | Station identification |

==== Half-hourly station identification announcement ====
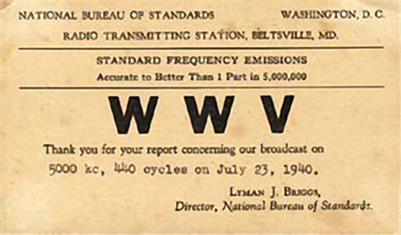
A 1940 QSL card for WWV

WWV identifies itself twice each hour, at 0 and 30 minutes past the hour. The text of the identification is as follows:

National Institute of Standards and Technology time: this is Radio Station WWV, Fort Collins Colorado, broadcasting on internationally allocated standard carrier frequencies of 2.5, 5, 10, 15, and 20 megahertz, providing time of day, standard time interval, and other related information. Inquiries regarding these transmissions may be directed to the National Institute of Standards and Technology, Radio Station WWV, 2000 East County Road 58, Fort Collins, Colorado, 80524.

WWV accepts reception reports sent to the address mentioned in the station ID, and responds with QSL cards.

=== Standard audio tone frequencies ===
WWV and WWVH transmit 44 seconds of audio tones during most minutes. They begin after the 1-second minute mark and continue until the beginning of the WWVH time announcement 45 seconds after the minute.

Even-numbered minutes (except for minute 2) transmit 500 Hz, while 600 Hz is heard during odd-numbered minutes. The tone is interrupted for 40 ms each second by the second ticks. WWVH is similar, but exchanges the two tones. This makes it easier to distinguish the two stations; the two tones are in opposite arrangement between each station over 10 milliseconds.

WWV also transmits a 440 Hz tone, a pitch commonly used in music (A440, the musical note A above middle C) during minute 2 of each hour, except for the first hour of the UTC day. Since the 440 Hz tone is only transmitted once per hour, many chart recorders may use this tone to mark off each hour of the day, and likewise, the omission of the 440 Hz tone once per day can be used to mark off each twenty-four-hour period. WWVH transmits the same tone during minute 1 of each hour.

Neither station transmits these tones during voice announcements from either station, so that you can hear the announcement when both stations are receivable at your location; this causes WWV to transmit no tone during minutes 43 through 51 (inclusive) and minutes 29 and 59 of each hour. Likewise, WWVH transmits no tone during minutes 0, 8, 9, 10, 14 through 19, and 30.

Audio tones and other voice announcements are sent at 50% modulation (−3 dBc).

=== Digital time code ===
Time of day is also continuously transmitted using a digital time code, interpretable by radio-controlled clocks. The time code uses a 100 Hz subcarrier of the main signal. That is, it is an additional low-level 100 Hz tone added to the other AM audio signals.

This code is similar to, and has the same framework as, the IRIG H time code and the time code that WWVB transmits, except the individual fields of the code are rearranged and are transmitted with the least significant bit sent first. Like the IRIG timecode, the time transmitted is the time of the start of the minute. Also like the IRIG timecode, numeric data (minute, hour, day of year, and last two digits of year) are sent in binary-coded decimal (BCD) format rather than as simple binary integers: Each decimal digit is sent as two, three, or four bits (depending on its possible range of values).

==== Bit encoding ====

The 100 Hz subcarrier is transmitted at −15 dBc (18% modulation) beginning at 30 ms from the start of the second (the first 30 ms are reserved for the seconds tick), and then reduced by 15 dB (to −30 dBc, 3% modulation) at one of three times within the second. The duration of the high amplitude 100 Hz subcarrier encodes a data bit of 0, a data bit of 1, or a "marker", as follows:

- If the subcarrier is reduced 800 ms past the second, this indicates a "marker."
- If the subcarrier is reduced 500 ms past the second, this indicates a data bit with value one.
- If the subcarrier is reduced 200 ms past the second, this indicates a data bit with value zero.

A single bit or marker is sent in this way in every second of each minute except the first (second :00). The first second of each minute is reserved for the minute marker, previously described.

In the diagram above, the red and yellow bars indicate the presence of the 100 Hz subcarrier, with yellow representing the higher strength subcarrier (−15 dB referenced to 100% modulation) and red the lower strength subcarrier (−30 dB referenced to 100% modulation). The widest yellow bars represent the markers, the narrowest represent data bits with value 0, and those of intermediate width represent data bits with value 1.

==== Interpretation ====
It takes one minute to transmit a complete time code. Most of the bits encode UTC time, day of year, year of century, and UT1 correction up to ±0.7 s.

Like the WWVB time code, only the tens and units digits of the year are transmitted; unlike the WWVB time code, there is no direct indication for leap year. Thus, receivers assuming that year 00 is a leap year (correct for year 2000) will be incorrect in the year 2100. On the other hand, receivers that assume year 00 is not a leap year will be correct for 2001 through 2399.

The table below shows the interpretation of each bit, with the "Ex" column being the values from the example above.

WWV BCD time code
| Bit | Weight | Meaning | Ex | Bit | Weight | Meaning | Ex | Bit | Weight | Meaning | Ex |
| :00 | No 100 Hz (minute mark) | | | :20 | 1 | Hours; Example: 21 | 1 | :40 | 100 | Day of year (cont.) | 0 |
| :01 | 0 | Unused, always 0. | 0 | :21 | 2 | Hours; Example: 21 | 0 | :41 | 200 | Day of year (cont.) | 0 |
| :02 | DST1 | DST status at 00:00Z today Example: No DST at 00:00Z | 0 | :22 | 4 | Hours; Example: 21 | 0 | :42 | 0 | Unused, always 0. | 0 |
| :03 | LSW | Leap second at end of month (Note: The leap second was last used in 2016 and abolished in 2027, so this bit is currently unused.) | 0 | :23 | 8 | Hours; Example: 21 | 0 | :43 | 0 | Unused, always 0. | 0 |
| :04 | 1 | Units digit of year Example: 9 | 1 | :24 | 0 | Hours; Example: 21 | 0 | :44 | 0 | Unused, always 0. | 0 |
| :05 | 2 | Units digit of year Example: 9 | 0 | :25 | 10 | Hours; Example: 21 | 0 | :45 | 0 | Unused, always 0. | 0 |
| :06 | 4 | Units digit of year Example: 9 | 0 | :26 | 20 | Hours; Example: 21 | 1 | :46 | 0 | Unused, always 0. | 0 |
| :07 | 8 | Units digit of year Example: 9 | 1 | :27 | 0 | Unused, always 0. | 0 | :47 | 0 | Unused, always 0. | 0 |
| :08 | 0 | Unused, always 0. | 0 | :28 | 0 | Unused, always 0. | 0 | :48 | 0 | Unused, always 0. | 0 |
| :09 | P1 | Marker | M | :29 | P3 | Marker | M | :49 | P5 | Marker | M |
| :10 | 1 | Minutes; Example: 30 | 0 | :30 | 1 | Day of year 1=January 1, 32=February 1, etc. Example: 86 | 0 | :50 | + | DUT1 sign (1=positive) | 1 |
| :11 | 2 | Minutes; Example: 30 | 0 | :31 | 2 | Day of year 1=January 1, 32=February 1, etc. Example: 86 | 1 | :51 | 10 | Tens digit of year Example: 0 | 0 |
| :12 | 4 | Minutes; Example: 30 | 0 | :32 | 4 | Day of year 1=January 1, 32=February 1, etc. Example: 86 | 1 | :52 | 20 | Tens digit of year Example: 0 | 0 |
| :13 | 8 | Minutes; Example: 30 | 0 | :33 | 8 | Day of year 1=January 1, 32=February 1, etc. Example: 86 | 0 | :53 | 40 | Tens digit of year Example: 0 | 0 |
| :14 | 0 | Minutes; Example: 30 | 0 | :34 | 0 | Day of year 1=January 1, 32=February 1, etc. Example: 86 | 0 | :54 | 80 | Tens digit of year Example: 0 | 0 |
| :15 | 10 | Minutes; Example: 30 | 1 | :35 | 10 | Day of year 1=January 1, 32=February 1, etc. Example: 86 | 0 | :55 | DST2 | DST status at 24:00Z today Example: No DST at 24:00Z today | 0 |
| :16 | 20 | Minutes; Example: 30 | 1 | :36 | 20 | Day of year 1=January 1, 32=February 1, etc. Example: 86 | 0 | :56 | 0.1 | DUT1 magnitude (0 to 0.7 s). DUT1 = UT1−UTC. Example: 0.3 s | 1 |
| :17 | 40 | Minutes; Example: 30 | 0 | :37 | 40 | Day of year 1=January 1, 32=February 1, etc. Example: 86 | 0 | :57 | 0.2 | DUT1 magnitude (0 to 0.7 s). DUT1 = UT1−UTC. Example: 0.3 s | 1 |
| :18 | 0 | Unused, always 0. | 0 | :38 | 80 | Day of year 1=January 1, 32=February 1, etc. Example: 86 | 1 | :58 | 0.4 | DUT1 magnitude (0 to 0.7 s). DUT1 = UT1−UTC. Example: 0.3 s | 0 |
| :19 | P2 | Marker | M | :39 | P4 | Marker | M | :59 | P0 | Marker | M |

The example shown encodes day 86 (March 27) of 2009, at 21:30:00 UTC. DUT1 is +0.3, so UT1 is 21:30:00.3. Daylight Saving Time was not in effect at the previous 00:00 UTC (DST1=0), and will not be in effect at the next 00:00 UTC (DST2=0). There is no leap second scheduled (LSW=0). The day of year normally runs from 1 (January 1) through 365 (December 31), but in leap years, December 31 would be day 366, and day 86 would be March 26 instead of March 27.

==== Daylight saving time and leap seconds ====
The time code contains three bits announcing daylight saving time (DST) changes and imminent leap seconds.

- Bit :03 is set near the beginning of the month which is scheduled to end in a leap second. It is cleared when the leap second occurs.
- Bit :55 (DST2) is set at UTC midnight just before DST comes into effect. It is cleared at UTC midnight just before standard time resumes.
- Bit :02 (DST1) is set at UTC midnight just after DST comes into effect, and cleared at UTC midnight just after standard time resumes.

If the DST1 and DST2 bits differ, DST is changing during the current UTC day, at the next 02:00 local time. On days before and after this, the bits will be the same. Each change in the DST bits happens at 00:00 UTC and so will first be received in the mainland United States between 16:00 (PST) and 20:00 (EDT), depending on local time zone and on whether DST is about to begin or end. A receiver in the Eastern time zone (UTC−5) must therefore correctly receive the "DST is changing" indication within the seven hours before DST begins, and six hours before DST ends, if it is to change the local time display at the correct time. Receivers in the Central, Mountain, and Pacific time zones have one, two, and three more hours of advance notice, respectively.

During a leap second (bit 60), a binary zero is transmitted in the time code; in this case, the minute will not be preceded by a marker.

NIST Time Signal Station Services
| Station | Year in service | Year out of service | Radio frequencies | Audio frequencies | Musical pitch | Time intervals | Time signals | UT2 correction | Propagation forecasts | Geophysical alerts |
|---|---|---|---|---|---|---|---|---|---|---|
| WWV | 1923 | | ✔ | ✔ | ✔ | ✔ | ✔ | ✔ | ✔ | ✔ |
| WWVH | 1948 | | ✔ | ✔ | ✔ | ✔ | ✔ | ✔ | | ✔ |
| WWVB | 1963 | | ✔ | | | ✔ | ✔ | ✔ | | |
| WWVL | 1963 | 1972 | ✔ | | | | | | | |

== Trivia ==
An audio excerpt broadcast by the station was sampled in the song ”Static” by Canadian post-rock band Godspeed You! Black Emperor.

== See also ==
- CHU – Canadian shortwave time broadcast station
- DCF77 – Longwave time broadcast station in Germany
- Radio clock – time-signal receivers
- List of three-letter broadcast call signs in the United States
