= IEEE 1344 =

IEEE standard for parameters for synchrophasors for power systems

IEEE 1344 is a standard that defines parameters for synchrophasors for power systems. The standard added extension to the IRIG-B time code to cover year, time quality, daylight saving time, local time offset and leap second information. IEEE 1344 was superseded by IEEE C37.118 in 2005 and the time extensions were adopted as part of the IRIG timing standard in the 2004 edition.

== Description ==
IRIG-B timecode consists of 100 bits, repeated each second. Every tenth bit is a "position identifier", and most of the remainder encode the current time (date, hour, minute and second). Bits 60–68 and 70–78 are reserved for other uses; IEEE 1344 is such a use. It defines the bits as follows:

IEEE 1344 extensions to IRIG B
Bit	Weight	Meaning	Bit	Weight	Meaning
60	LSP	Leap second pending at end of minute	70	0.5	Time zone offset
61	LS	Leap second type (0=add, 1=delete)	71	1	Time quality (Binary, 0–15)
62	DSP	DST change pending at end of minute	72	2	Time quality (Binary, 0–15)
63	DST	DST in effect	73	4	Time quality (Binary, 0–15)
64	±	Time zone offset sign (0=+, 1=−)	74	8	Time quality (Binary, 0–15)
65	1	Time zone offset (0–15.5)	75	PAR	Even parity of bits 1−74
66	2	Time zone offset (0–15.5)	76	0	Unused
67	4	Time zone offset (0–15.5)	77	0	Unused
68	8	Time zone offset (0–15.5)	78	0	Unused
69	P_{7}	Position identifier	79	P_{8}	Position identifier

The DST and leap warning bits are set no more than 59 seconds before the indicated change, and indicate the change at the end of the minute. During a leap second, the warning bit should be set, the seconds field should show "60", and the Straight Binary Seconds field should equal 60 + 60 × minutes + 3600 × hours. The next second, the leap second warning bit should be clear, and the SBS field will repeat. Since negative leap seconds have never happened, and almost certainly never will, the LS bit is always 0.

The clock quality indication is a binary value. 0 means the clock is locked to a UTC-traceable source, without specifying a particular accuracy, and 15 means the clock has failed and the time is not reliable. Values between 1 and 11 indicate the time is accurate to within 10^{x−10} seconds of UTC, i.e. x=1 indicates UTC±1 ns, while x=11 indicates UTC±10 s.

The time zone offset indicates the difference UTC – timecode, so UTC = timecode + offset. This value changes when DST is active. The Straight Binary Seconds field also jumps by 3600 when this happens.

The parity bit is even parity over all data bits from 1 through 74. Marker bits are ignored (or, equivalently, read as 0).

The standard also calls for indicating 2 digits of year in bits 50–58, which has been incorporated into the IRIG since 2004.

== IEEE C37.118 ==
IEEE C37.118 is designed to replace IEEE 1344. Instead of being based on IRIG and binary-coded decimals, the new standard uses a section format using ordinary binary integers. It also comes with a separate part to deal with matters such as synchophasor performance and frequency of measurement.

C37.118-2005 uses the opposite sign convention for time zone offset: offset = timecode − UTC, UTC = timecode − offset.
