= Time lady =

Time lady may refer to:

- Time Lady, any female member of the Time Lord species on the science fiction television programme Doctor Who
- The Time Lady, a character in the Diana Wynne Jones novel A Tale of Time City
- Time lady, a female voice heard on a speaking clock that people could dial to find out the current time, down to the second, before the Internet and other options for finding out the time existed.
  - UK:
    - Jane Cain
    - Pat Simmons (voice actor)
    - Sara Mendes da Costa
  - U.S.:
    - Jane Barbe
    - Joanne Daniels
    - Pat Fleet
    - Mary Moore (voice actor)
