= Audichron Company =

American talking clock company

Audichron Company was a company founded in the 1930s by John Franklin in Doraville, Georgia, to produce the Audichron, a talking clock. By the 1970s, there were thousands of Audichron time-of-day announcers in use all over the world. Audichron had also developed a machine to announce the temperature. During the 1970s and 1980s, Audichron began to manufacture other kinds of equipment besides time and temperature machines.

The Audichron sales force found sponsors, such as banks, for its time and temperature machines in a city. Once a sponsor had been obtained, Audichron would lease the machines to the local phone company. An Audichron field service engineer would then visit the telephone company and help install the Audichron equipment in the central office. The phone company would then hook up incoming trunks to the Audichron equipment and would bill the final customer (e.g., the bank) each month for the trunks and the Audichron equipment. Audichron received payments from the telephone company.

Audichron hired speakers to come into its recording studio to make recordings. Each customer could choose between a man's voice and a woman's on the announcements. During the 1950s, Mary Moore did the female voice. She was replaced, about 1965, by Jane Barbe, who specialized primarily in time and weather. Pat Fleet joined, in 1981, with customer-message recordings, coin-amount requests, and out-of-service recordings; she rarely did time and weather.

John Doyle continues to be the only male voice. From the 1980s, the female voices were provided by Barbe and Fleet; they were joined by Joanne Daniels, who did number-change announcements and who was the "time lady" for most of the Western United States.

Audichron systems were installed in ground and airborne ionospheric measurement systems, to report and record audio timestamps consisting of month, day, year, hour, minute, and tens of seconds.

The Audichron Company was acquired in 1989 by Electronic Tele-Communications, a manufacturer of telephone answering machines that was founded in 1949.

== Patents ==
- US patent 3974338, Luzier, Harman E; Colt, Jon C & Cobb, Douglas R, "Apparatus for automatic message reprogramming of a message announcement system", published 1976-08-10, issued 1976-08-10, assigned to The Audichron Company
- US patent 4005491, Walker, Walter P; Smith, Leary W & Cofer Jr, Frank H et al., "Dampened transducer support apparatus for message announcing system", published 1977-01-25, issued 1977-01-25, assigned to The Audichron Company
- US patent 4389546, Glisson, David; Huber, Gerald & Biskey, Bruce, "Digital announcement system including remote loading and interrogation", published 1983-06-21, issued 1983-06-21, assigned to The Audichron Company
- US patent 4406925, Jordan, Royce D & O'Neal, Edgar L, "Message delivery system", published 1983-09-27, issued 1983-09-27, assigned to The Audichron Company
- US patent 4446337, Cofer, Frank H, "Method and apparatus for revertive automatic intercept message delivery in a telephone system", published 1984-05-01, issued 1984-05-01, assigned to The Audichron Company
- US patent 4791666, Cobb, Douglas R; Glisson, David K & Fields, Raymond C et al., "Automatic intercept system interface for electromechanical telephone central office", published 1988-12-13, issued 1988-12-13, assigned to The Audichron Company
