= OSPS =

OSPS may refer to:

- Oficjalny słownik polskiego scrabblisty, a publication containing all Polish words allowed in the game of Scrabble in Polish
- Operator Services Position System, an ergonomically designed telephone operator workstation developed by AT&T
