= Audichron =

Talking clock

Audichron was a talking clock, or a time announcer which was developed and produced by the Audichron Company, starting in the 1930s. There were several types of Audichron machines including the stand time piece (STM), M12, temperature machine (TEMP) and the Comparator.

== Types ==
=== STM ===
STM stood for "Small Town Machine".

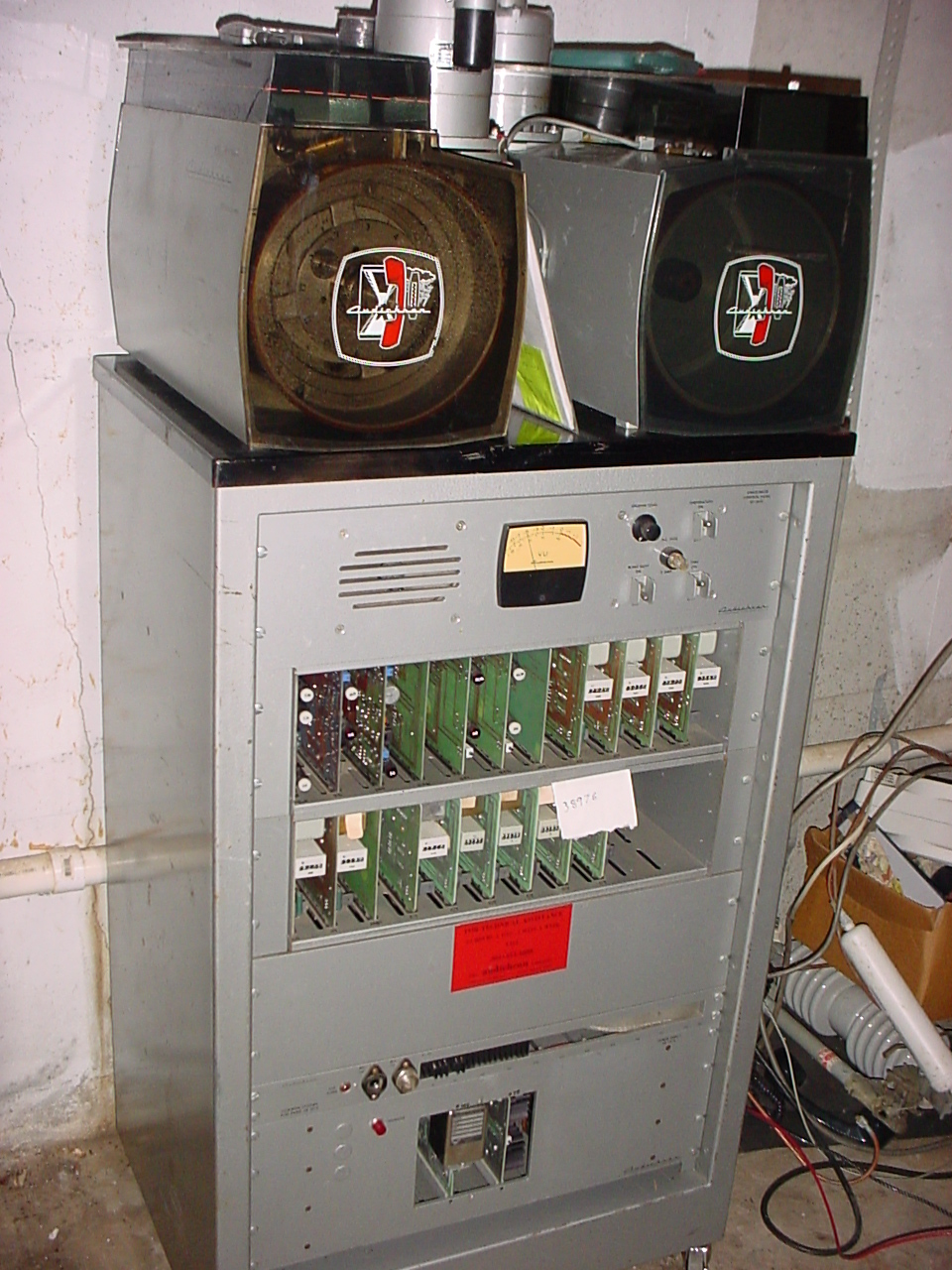
Audichron STM100-T

This was the standard time piece. It made announcements such as: "Save by the 10th, earn from the first, at Central Brevard National Bank. Time one forty two." The STM had three recording drums and two sound heads. The drum on the left side of the machine was the widest; it held the customers' messages. On the right side of the machine were the hour drum and the minute drum. The hour drum was the narrowest of the three drums; it simply had the hours 1 through 12 recorded on it. The minute drum had the minutes 1 through 59 and o'clock recorded on it.

Inside the STM were a series of gears that caused the drums to rotate and index independently to new messages (there were up to twenty four messages on a drum, twelve each in two groups), new hours and new minutes. There was a sound head on each side of the machine. The first would come down and play the message. Then it would be raised and the other sound head would drop down to play the hours and minutes. STMs were typically used in small towns with fairly low traffic volume.

=== M12 ===
This machine was similar in design to the STM machine.

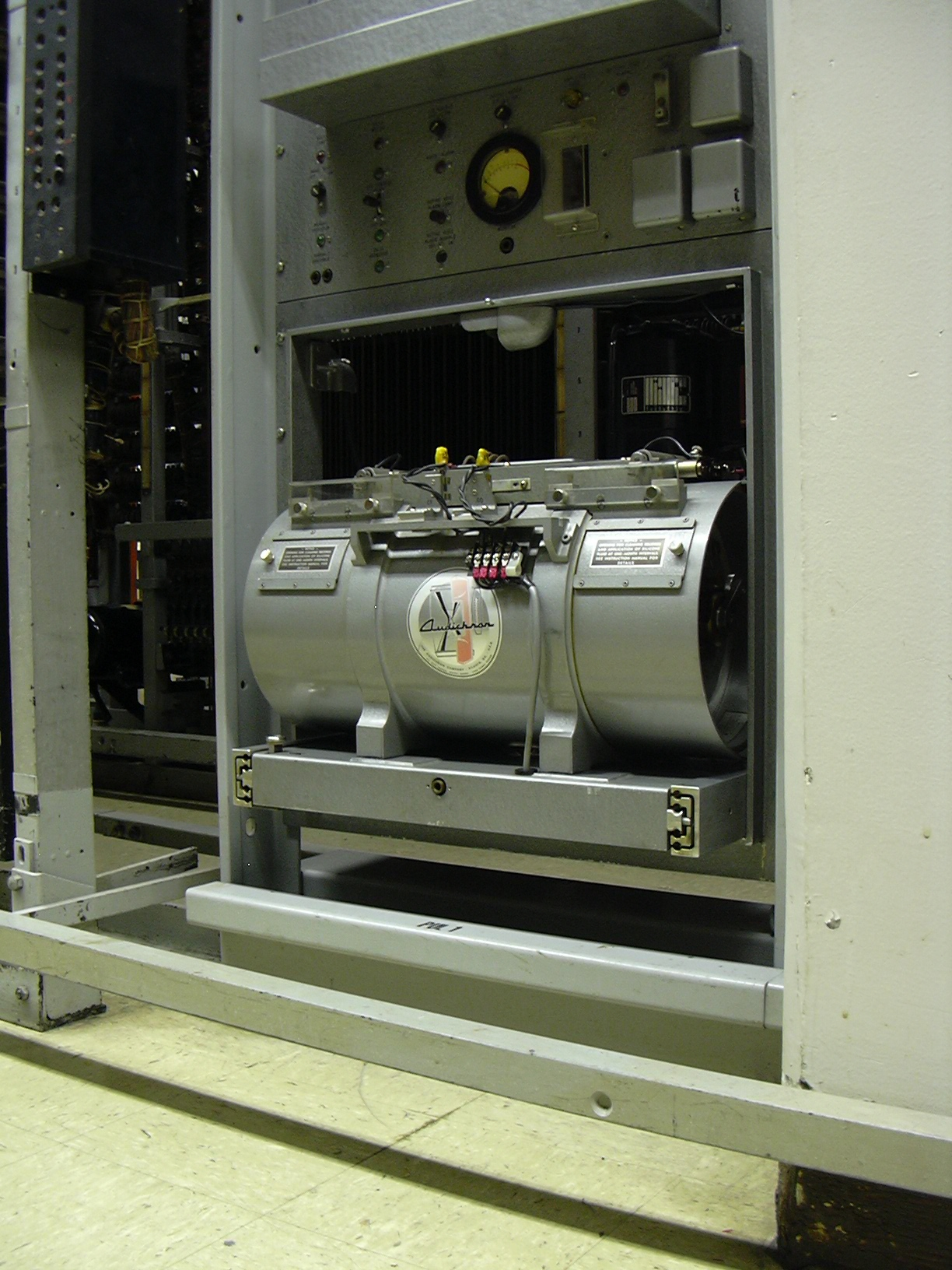
Audichron M-12

However, it had a feature called TLP (traffic load protection). M12s were used in larger cities with high call volumes. When call volumes were heavy, the M12 would shorten the message and then give the time. For example, "Central Brevard National Bank Time four o'clock." This allowed the phone company to handle more calls without overwhelming its system.

=== Temp ===
This was the temperature machine.

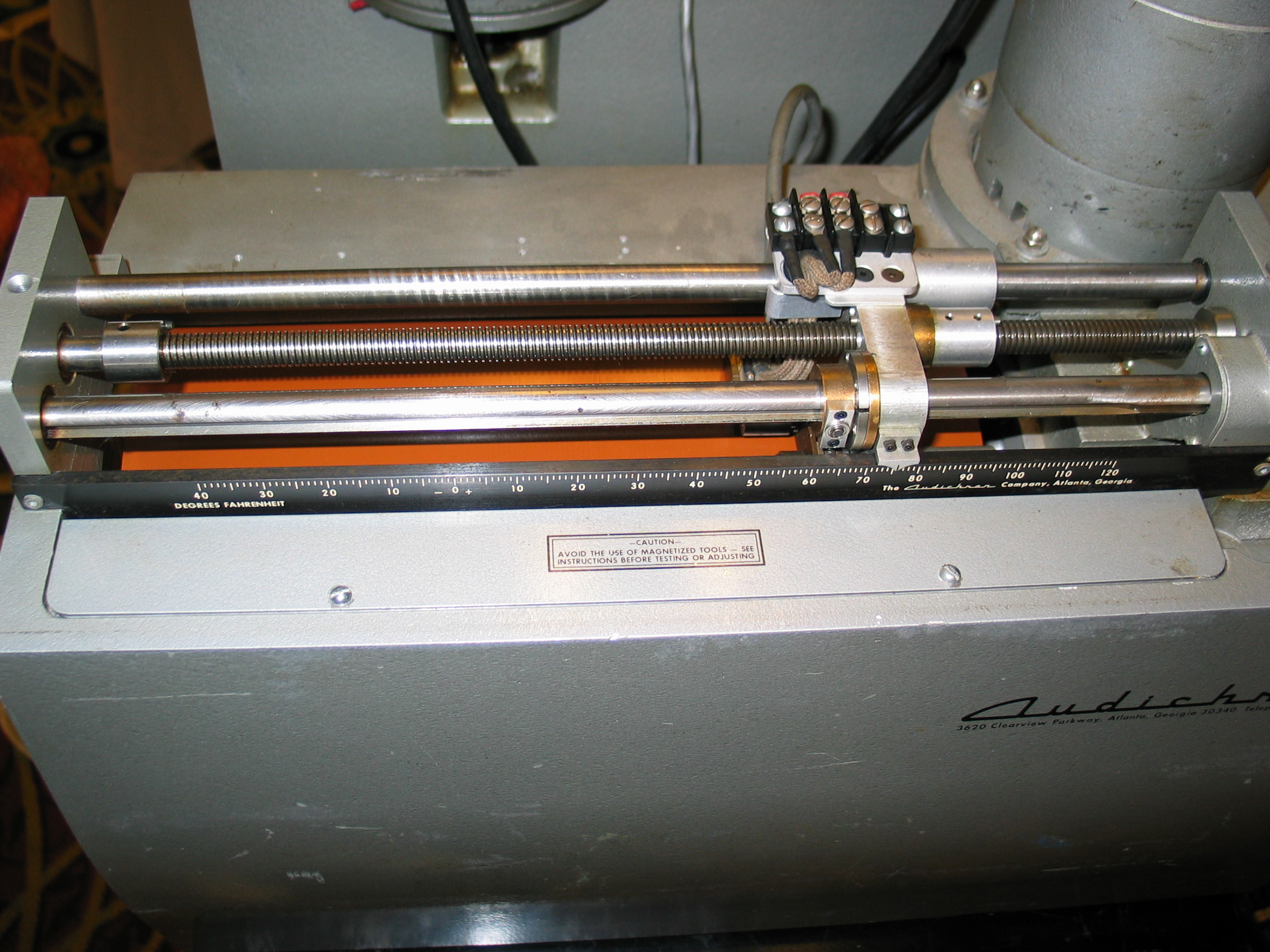
Top view of Temperature mechanism

It consisted of a long rotating drum (perhaps 18 inches long). Recorded on the drum were a series of temperatures (minus 40 °F to 120 °F, or −40 °C to 50 °C). A single soundhead was attached to a lead screw. A thermometer was placed on top of the telephone company central office and connected to the Audichron temperature machine. This would cause the leadscrew to rotate and position the soundhead on top of the correct temperature recording.

Thus with a time and temperature machine, a caller might hear: "Save by the 10th, earn from the first, at Central Brevard National Bank. Time one forty two. Temperature 98." In reality they were hearing announcements with four rotating drums on two separate mechanisms. Audichron sometimes made special temperature machines that went up to 140 degrees Fahrenheit (60 degrees Celsius) for desert cities in such states as California, Arizona as well as others.

=== Comparator ===
The comparator units were found only in the largest cities. They were similar to M12 units but had an extra drum for seconds. Callers heard messages such as: "At the tone, the time will be twelve fifteen and 10 seconds" followed by a tone. The comparator units used an oscilloscope to monitor the National Bureau of Standards radio station WWV to ensure the time was accurate. WWV used an Audichron machine to broadcast the time over the radio.

== Voice talent ==
- Mary Moore
- Jane Barbe
- Joanne Daniels
- Pat Fleet
- Don Elliott Heald
