= Advista =

Norwegian company

Advista AS
- Industry: Telecommunications
- Founded: 2003
- Headquarters: Oslo, Norway
- Key people: Stian Gundersen(Chairman of the board), Øyvind Bangsund(President and CEO)
- Products: Online yellow pages, white pages, search engines
- Website: http://www.advista.no/

Advista AS is a Norwegian company offering search services and directory assistance 180.no (Norway) in 13 European countries. The company was founded in 2003 by Stian Gundersen, Øyvind Bangsund and Benjamin Fauchald. Advistas products are based on technology provided by Google.
