= Infone =

Directory assistance service company

Infone was a service launched by Metro One Telecommunications in 2003. The service was discontinued effective December 14, 2005.

== How it worked ==
Infone included directory assistance and other services via a toll-free phone number. A user could call 888-411-1111 to request directory assistance, directions, traffic information, movie times, call completion, dinner reservation assistance and other services.

Infone provided a number of innovative 411 'concierge'-like services, including movie listings from a live operator, and offered a feature where they could provide information from a linked Microsoft Outlook calendar when set up in advance. For a period of time they advertised heavily on U.S. television, featuring ads with then Governor of Minnesota Jesse Ventura, emphasizing their use of all U.S. based operators. The price offered was $0.89 per call up to 15 minutes (for use when the operator connects you to the requested number, as well as for additional information requests afterwards), with $0.05 for each additional minute, making Infone also a competitively priced long-distance service. New users received 5–10 free calls.

Infone identified a registered user (along with billing information; the service was only payable by credit card) by caller ID (numbers were registered on signing up) and by an advanced voiceprint recognition system (VPRS) from SpeechWorks that identified the user when the user called from an unregistered telephone number (or no caller ID) through the use of a personal phrase spoken by the user (e.g., "Hello Infone!") after the welcome tone.
