= Traffic Service Position System =

Computerized telephone switchboard

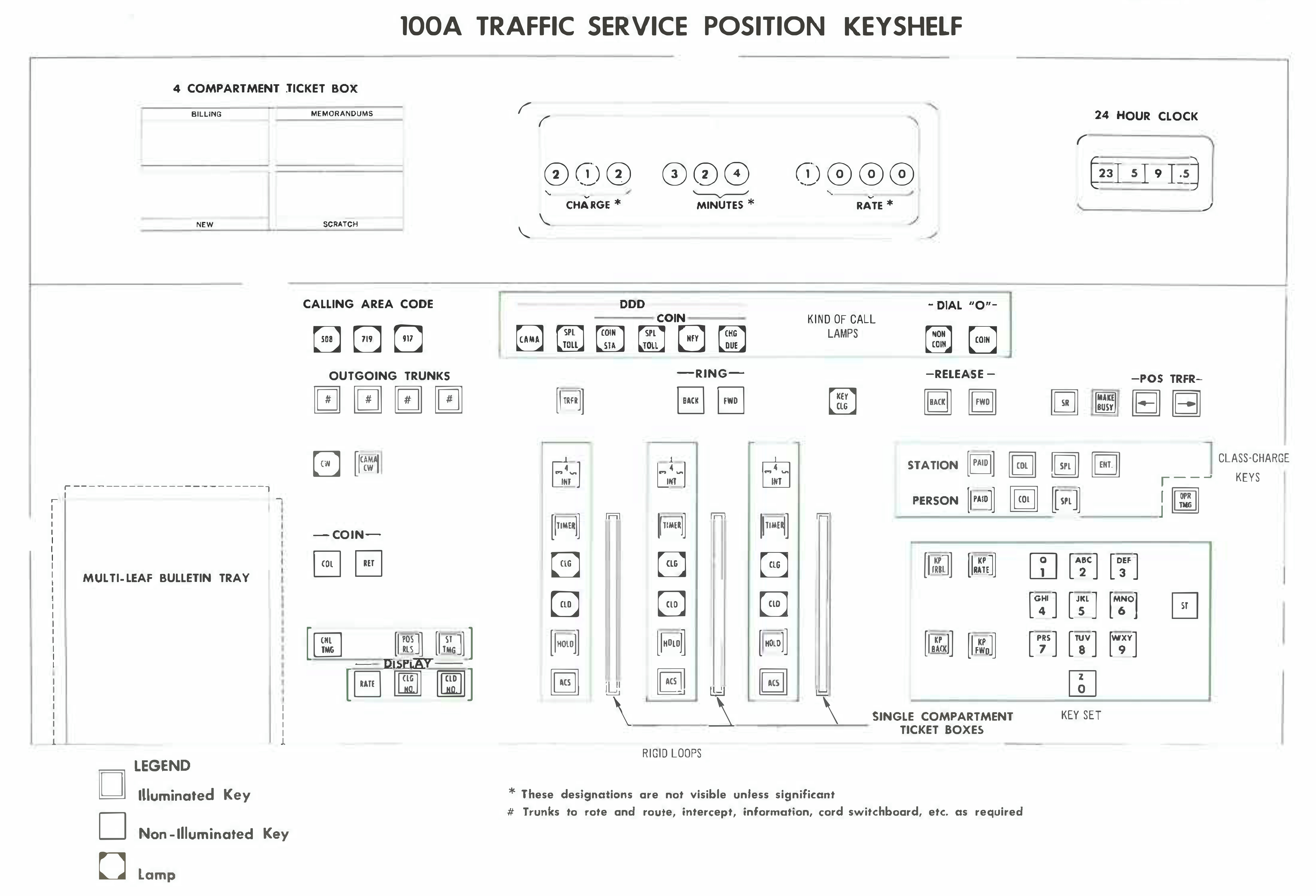
Original 1963 Layout of a 100A Traffic Service Position

Zip tone
Audible tone which alerts TSPS operator of a new call. 440 Hz 5 ms.

The Traffic Service Position System (TSPS) was developed by Bell Labs in Columbus, Ohio to replace traditional cord switchboards. The first TSPS was deployed in Morristown, New Jersey in 1969 and used the Stored Program Control-1A CPU, "Piggyback" twistor memory (a proprietary technology developed by Bell Labs similar to core memory) and Insulated Gate Field Effect Transistor solid state memory devices similar to dynamic random access memory.

== Features ==
The TSPS system utilized special analog trunks that originated at Class 5 end office circuit switch systems and Class 4 toll access circuit switch systems that were connected to Class 3 primary toll circuit switch systems such as the 4A-ETS/PBC and 4ESS switch systems. The TSPS system did not perform switching between the originating end office switch and the toll switch for the subscriber voice path.

The TSPS system included the "Remote Trunking Arrangement" (RTA) feature that consolidated the trunk connection at the originating switch and provided a switched connection to a telephone operator only as required for a short duration at the beginning of a call to obtain billing information or at the end of a call in which the caller requested "time and charges".

The TSPS system provided a temporary switched connection to a toll operator who helped facilitate calls requiring human assistance such as person-to-person, collect, third-party-billed, and hotel billing. The TSPS system supported up to seven "Chief Operator Groups" (COGs) with each COG supporting up to 31 operator consoles, with two operator positions per console, for a total of 62 operators per COG. Operator consoles initially used nixie tubes to display phone numbers, that were quickly replaced by light-emitting diode displays due to reliability issues.

The TSPS system was replaced by the Operator Service Position System (OSPS) feature package developed for the 5ESS switching system. During the era of TSPS systems, calls to mobile and marine radiotelephone customers were initially handled by operators at a Special Operator Service Treatment cord switchboard. Operator assisted calls to international destinations were handled by "Code 10" and "Code 11" operators generally co-located at special gateway international switching systems.

=== Operator Console ===
The Traffic Service Position keyshelf was organized into functional groups of keys and lamps covering all aspects of call handling. Major sections included AMA (Automatic Message Accounting) timing controls, coin collection and return keys, class-charge keys (Station Paid, Person Paid, Collect, No AMA, Special Number/Credit Card, Hotel), and release and forward keys. A four-compartment ticket box on the console held mark sense billing cards in designated slots (New, Cancel, Scratch, and Completed).

==== Loops ====
Operators managed up to three simultaneous call connections, referred to as "loops," each of which contained its own card slot and presented in one of three recognized states:

- New Call Condition — a call newly arrived at the position, or one in which a new number has been keyed forward, requiring the operator to set the class-charge and initiate timing before release.
- Recall Access Condition — a call returning to the operator on a Notify (NFY) or Charge Due (CHG DUE) signal, or a customer flashing on a held call.
- Interim Access Condition — a transitional state following operation of the Cancel Call or Record Message key, before a new number is set up forward.

==== Underglass bulletin ====
Each TSPS operator position included an underglass bulletin — a printed reference sheet mounted beneath the glass surface of the console work area, kept continuously accessible without the operator leaving the position. It served as the primary quick-reference source for information needed during live calls. Contents included: Bell System telephone credit card validity check lists (letter–digit correspondence tables, invalid Revenue Accounting Office (RAO) codes, and invalid card number lists); authorized special billing numbers; a zone map for determining Message unit (MU) rate steps for metropolitan area calls; and miscellaneous emergency numbers. The layout of the underglass bulletin was periodically revised by management as procedures changed.

==== Multi-leaf bulletin ====
Supplementing the underglass bulletin, each TSPS position maintained a multi-leaf bulletin, also known as a cardex, multi-card, or flip cards, a card-file reference system containing rate and routing information organized by NPA and NXX. Pages typically covered rate steps and call routing for all points in the operator's serving area, overseas call procedures (with International Direct Distance Dialing points marked with asterisks), and a dedicated number-test page. Pages were updated by management staff as rate changes, new exchanges, or routing changes occurred. Operators were expected to consult the cards rather than rely on memory for rates, routing, or number-test procedures.

=== Billing ===
For calls handled automatically by the Automatic Message Accounting (AMA) system, billing data was captured electronically by the TSPS equipment. For calls requiring manual operator involvement — including credit card, third-number, collect, and hotel calls — operators recorded billing data on IBM Mark sense cards. These paper cards contained pre-printed digit columns that operators completed using a mechanical pencil; the marked cards were subsequently processed by optical scanning equipment, bridging manual and automated billing workflows.

Key fields on the front of the card included originating area code and number, destination NPA and NXX, dial rate, charge class, connect and disconnect times, elapsed minutes, and a "Bill To" section for third-number and credit card calls. The reverse of the card recorded charge amount, elapsed minutes, credit information, and special conditions such as Notify, Charge Due, or Delayed Call Trunk.

==== Charge class designations ====
The mark-sense card included a set of pre-printed bubble fields that operators marked with a stylus to indicate the class of service for each call. In addition to the primary charge classes (Station Paid, Person Paid, Collect, Credit Card, Third Number, Hotel), specific situations called for supplementary bubble markings:

- Dial Rate — marked when a customer-dialable call was handled by the operator due to a defined condition: the customer stated a physical handicap; the customer had made more than one unsuccessful dial attempt for reasons other than busy, no answer, or a single wrong number; the called or calling place was not equipped for Direct Distance Dialing (including toll stations and mobile telephone points); or the customer experienced a cutoff or poor transmission on a dialable call. Operators were required to establish which condition applied before marking the dial rate, and could be charged with a billing error for marking it incorrectly.
- Part Charge (PT CHG) — marked when a coin-paid call incurred additional charges beyond the initial deposit. The part charge procedure required the operator to note the elapsed time and total amount collected on the back of the original ticket; determine the under-deposit amount; enter the billing arrangement for the additional charge (called telephone, credit card, or third number) in the report space; and erase the original "Coin Paid" bubble. A separate collect or third-number acceptance was required if the additional charge was billed accordingly.
- Mobile designations — effective November 12, 1973, calls involving IMTS roaming and manual mobile service (identified by the two-letter, five-digit "2L+5D" number format) were marked with specific mobile bubbles. A call originating from a mobile unit required the MOB ORIG bubble and the NXX code of the originating base station in the "From NXX" field; if the mobile unit was registered at a different base station, the MOB ROAM bubble was also marked. A call terminating at a mobile unit required the MOB TERM bubble, with the called NXX code as provided by the terminating mobile operator, and again MOB ROAM if roaming. These entries applied to both manual mobile and IMTS roaming calls; standard IMTS calls without roaming were handled without change.

== Operator Training ==
TSPS operators underwent structured Phase training using a series of numbered Practice Tapes — audio simulations of live operator calls against which trainees drilled console procedures in real time. Each tape covered a specific call type or condition:

Tape	Call Type
PT5001	Person Paid (Coin and Non-Coin)
PT5002	Station Paid and Steady Recalls (Coin)
PT5003	Notification Calls and Recalls (Non-Coin)
PT5004	Collect Calls — Charges Accepted
PT5005	Collect Calls — Charges Not Accepted
PT5006	Credit Card and Special Number Calls
PT5007	Third Number Calls (Non-Coin)
PT5009	Person Delay Calls, Completed or Canceled
PT5010	Person Delay Calls, Leaving Word (Non-Coin)
PT5011	Person Delays, Another Telephone (Non-Coin)
PT5012	Person Delays, Another Telephone (Coin)
PT5013	DA Procedures Canceled
PT5014	Calls with Busys or Reorders, Completed or Canceled
PT5015	Calls with Station Delays, Recorded (Non-Coin)
PT5016	Completing Subsequent Attempts
PT5019	Flashing Recalls, New Calls, and Wrong Numbers
PT5020	Flashing Recalls
PT5021	Dial "0" Calls
PT5022	Calls with Station Paid (Non-Coin)
PT5023	Calls Requiring Routes and Numbers
PT5024	Third Number Calls (Coin)
PT5225	T&C Calls and Recalls, Non-Coin, Including Dial Zero
PT5227	Hotel Station and Zero Plus AMA Timing, Including Dial Zero
PT5261	Single Digit Call Back Calls (6 and 7)

The training framework was organized around three core service principles designated ACS, Accuracy, Courtesy, and Speed, which operators were trained to recall each time the ACS key illuminated on their console. Bell System training materials described ACS as the key to customer satisfaction: accuracy was essential both for correct call handling and for proper automated billing; courtesy was required on every call, particularly as the TSPS console interface was new to customers accustomed to cord-board operators; and speed was critical both for the customer being served and for minimizing wait times for other callers queued at the position.

Each call type was taught using a standard three-step framework: Set-up (class-charge the call and prepare the console), Complete (announce, listen for ring, or secure acceptance as appropriate), and Follow-through (start timing, release position). Standardized scripted phrases were provided for each scenario, such as the collect call acceptance phrase: "I have a collect call for (Called Party), from (Calling Party). Will you accept the charge?"

Operators were also trained in overlapping, performing follow-through tasks on one call during natural pauses in another, and in the handling of unfamiliar conditions, with instructions to note as much information as possible without interrupting the customer, then consult the service assistant at the earliest opportunity.

== Hotel Billing Information System ==
The TSPS system included the Hotel Billing Information System (HoBIS) special feature to provide automated billing of long-distance calls from hotel front desks so guests could be charged for calls made almost immediately prior to their departure. Private Teletype data links were provisioned to large hotels that subscribed to this service.

== Automated Coin Toll System ==
Five cents for the next three minutes
Pat Fleet reading an ACTS automated warning to deposit five cents to continue a coin paid call.

Debuted in Phoenix, Arizona in 1977, the Automated Coin Toll System (ACTS) was an addition to TSPS which provided an automated way to perform charge advisory and toll collection of coin paid calls, reducing the need for operator involvement. The ACTS sub-system handled the automated voice announcements, e.g. "Please deposit five cents for the next three minutes" (initially voiced by Jane Barbe, and later Pat Fleet), and worked with TSPS for coin deposit (start of call) and coin collection/coin return (at end of call).

== Computerized Position Information System ==
Introduced in 1986, the Computerized Position Information System (COMPIS) augmented existing TSPS hardware with a video display terminal (VDT) and a movable keyboard on an extended cord. Originally intended for tasks occupying approximately 10% of an operator's shift, COMPIS usage climbed rapidly to around 50% of working time, well beyond the ergonomic parameters of the add-on design. COMPIS was therefore treated as a transitional system to the next generation of equipment.

== Successor: Operator Services Position System ==
With full deployment planned for late 1990, the Operator Services Position System (OSPS) was developed as a feature package for the 5ESS switch to replace the aging TSPS infrastructure. Where TSPS had itself represented a significant advance over manual corded switchboards, the OSPS design incorporated four decades of accumulated ergonomics research that had not been available to TSPS engineers.

AT&T's stated ergonomic goals for OSPS included standardized procedures for call keying and system feedback, and a console and screen display layout designed to support human factors principles across the full range of operator duties.
