= PLAR =

PLAR may mean:

- Private line automatic ringdown, a telephony term
- Prior learning assessment and recognition, an educational term used mainly in Canada
