= Non-dialable point =

In conventional landline telephony, a non-dialable toll point or toll station ("station" in the sense of "place where a telephone is installed") was a lone station or line serving a rural subscriber many miles from the nearest central office. As it had no home telephone exchange and therefore no local calling area, no customer could dial its number; all connections to it had to be obtained manually by the long distance operator.

These toll stations were one of multiple categories of non-dialable points which could only be reached with assistance from the inward operator at destination. Other non-dialable points included locations reachable only by some form of two-way radio and specific categories of manual service.

As manual services are replaced by automated infrastructure and satellite telephony now reaches the most distant points on the globe, truly non-dialable points are becoming rare.

== Toll stations ==
To reach remote rural locations, telephone companies have been created with as little as one subscriber (the Methodist Episcopal Corporation, established in the 1940s to interconnect a Methodist church in Carmanville, Ontario, to Bell Canada's long-distance network, was taken over by Bell in 1970).

A similar service was provided in North America using toll stations or "ring downs", individual subscribers who were connected over many miles of landline directly to AT&T long distance with no local calling area. Reachable only with operator assistance, these served points like Deep Springs College in Deep Springs, California (whose telephone number for much of the 1980s remained "Deep Springs Toll Station #2"), far corners of the Nevada or California deserts and a few individual ranches in very remote corners of the Texas Panhandle. In Canada, regional incumbent local exchange carriers (such as Telus in Alberta, MTS in Manitoba or Bell Canada in Ontario and Quebec) provided operator assistance to complete inbound calls to non-dialable points.

Local telephone companies were installing toll stations in distant rural areas as recently as the 1970s. While many of these points have subsequently been transferred to conventional dial exchanges, in 1999 just over six hundred toll stations were still in service in the North American Numbering Plan. Many were a lone party line serving some remote hamlet too small for its own telephone exchange. In 1999, more than half of the remaining toll stations were in Canada, with Quebec and Newfoundland the largest users. The US toll stations remaining at that time mostly served rural Nevada, with a handful in California and Oregon.

A request for "Tinyville Toll Station #2" required the operator to call the inbound operator (NPA+121) or a special ringdown operator (NPA+181) at the destination, who would ring the single line to "Tinyville" using a specific pattern to signal the second subscriber on that line to answer. This system was confusing to operators, and was incompatible with any equipment that had an auto-dial modem, such as automated teller machines. Nevada Bell and GTE replaced the last of their Nevada toll stations with seven-digit dial service in 2001.

These points originally appeared directly in national AT&T or Bellcore routing tables; each would have its own V and H co-ordinates (as toll calls are billed by distance) and a non-dialable number for billing records (initially within the geographic area code, although often in an invalid format like 702-012-3456). The list of non-dialable points was later maintained by NANPA (in the US) and CNAC (in Canada). A pair of area codes (886 and 889), created along with 887 and 888 in the early 1980s and abolished on July 1, 2003, were used by NANPA and CNAC to list each non-dialable toll point as a rate centre and exchange (a block of ten thousand numbers with an associated geographic pair of V/H co-ordinates for billing distance calculation); these codes have since been reclaimed for use as future toll-free numbers.

=== 88X ===
During the 1980s and into the early 1990s, AT&T maintained eight pseudo-area-codes used to represent non-dialable locations. A "ticket" (manual or electronic) would use the six digits as point identification (out of a table) and rating location (using the V and H coordinates), with zeroes or some other representation using the last four digits. Each 88X-XXX combination had its own point name and V and H coordinates.

881, 882, 883 and 885 were used to refer to locations in Mexico that were not able to be direct dialed; these gradually disappeared as Mexico tied them into its dialing network, becoming a 52X (1 through 9) prefix instead. 88X-XXX would be followed by up to four digits of a local number.

886, 887, 888 and 889 were used to refer to assorted types of locations in Canada and the United States. Where the six-digit combination represented a radio telephone base station, the remaining four digits usually were used to give the last four digits of the radio telephone number. Where the six-digit combination represented a toll station as described above, the last four digits were all zeroes or might represent a specific subscriber sharing the same toll station. These codes were eventually eliminated when telephone companies decided to use the digits for other services; unlike the ones used for Mexico, their phase-out was far slower.

== Manual exchanges ==
Long after the introduction of local dial service to major cities in the 1920s, 1930s, and 1940s, and the creation of the original eighty-six North American area codes in 1947, calls to tiny, out-of-the way places continued to require time-consuming setup by multiple manual operators at various intermediate points. For example:

- In the Dragnet radio series (1949–1957), a call from a police sergeant in Los Angeles to a three-digit number in Murphy, Idaho was depicted in the radio version of Dragnet as a two-minute process where the officer dials a local long-distance operator, who contacts a rate-and-route operator, then has Boise, Idaho contact Nampa to manually contact an operator in Murphy, who rings the destination subscriber.
- Richard A. Pence wrote a (purportedly true) humorous story of calling home in 1950, to the befuddlement of the Philadelphia operator who learned that rural South Dakota telephones may have no number beyond "two longs and a short".

On a complex manual routing through multiple points, it was standard practice for the operator to ring the original subscriber back once a call was ready.

Not all manual telephone exchanges were non-dialable points. Some were equipped with apparatus which displayed the called number to an operator when an outside call arrived from an automated dial exchange; this panel call indicator or coded-call indicator working would have made them dialable points from other exchanges, despite the absence of local dial.

If a manual exchange did not have call indicator equipment but did have a published numeric exchange prefix, incoming calls from automatic exchanges would be prompted manually with "Number, please?" after the first few digits (or, in fixed-length store-and-forward systems like the UK director exchanges, the entire number) had already been dialed. A dial subscriber in one community would often need to call someone in the neighboring community. The directory would often instruct him to dial a single digit, such as seven, which would connect to the incoming manual operator for the neighboring community.

Destinations where numbers were in non-standard lengths or formats may have required an operator to dial the number or request assistance of an inward operator at the destination. Farmer Lines were in rural areas and consisted of non-standard numbering schemes like 23F21, which instructed the operator to plug into the jack designated 23F and ring 2 long and 1 short signal. Every telephone on the 23F line rang, so it was not unusual for everyone on the 23F circuit to pick up their telephone and listen in on the conversation. These Farmer Lines were gradually eliminated as the manual service was replaced by automatic dial equipment.

== Manual radio links ==
Historically, some entire telephone exchanges in remote communities were reachable from the outside world only by shortwave radio. The initial international calls to the Dominion of Newfoundland were made on January 10, 1939, on a Canadian Marconi Company shortwave link through Montréal and required operator assistance even after local calls within St. John's switched to dial in 1948. A similar shortwave radio link joined St. John's to London UK, operated manually. While the original eighty-six area codes (created in 1947) provided a routing code for operators to dial Montréal (514) or Halifax (902) directly, the operator would have had to ask a Canadian operator to attempt to reach Newfoundland by radio until some time after the 31 March 1949 confederation with Canada.

A similar system continued for many years in Canada's far north; Alma or Val-d'Or were points directly reachable by wire from which calls going further north were at one time carried manually by shortwave radio links. These manual links were gradually rendered obsolete by communications satellites and satellite telephony; even the North Pole, well beyond the reach of geosynchronous satellites, should be within the costly but automated reach of the Iridium satellite constellation.

== Manual mobile and marine ==
The first widespread deployment of automatic mobile telephone service was the Advanced Mobile Phone System, introduced in October 1983 and discontinued in the early 21st century. It, like its successors, is direct-dial. Earlier radio manual mobile systems had a very limited number of mobile channels and required that calls to Mobile Telephone Service and ship-to-shore subscribers be placed via the mobile or marine operator.

With the introduction of Cellular Telephone service, Improved Mobile Telephone Service was discontinued. Operator access has been discontinued to place calls to or from a Cellular Telephone.

== Other non-dialable numbers ==
- Some numbers were created (by design) solely for internal use by telco operators. These are dialable from the operator console but, absent a breach of security (such as the blue box cracks of the 1960s and 1970s), are not directly reachable by subscribers. These typically included international gateways, inward operators in distant cities and test or information numbers intended for internal telco use.
- Some international destinations remained undialable from certain countries due to a lack of infrastructure. Calls between the United States and Russia in the Cold War era were one example, as so few lines existed that an operator needed to ring back the calling party when one became available. These limitations are gradually disappearing as the underlying infrastructure improves.
- A manual freephone number (UK) or Zenith number (US, Canada) was operator-assisted; the operator located the corresponding geographic point (a dialable number) from a list and placed the collect call. These were replaced by area code 800 in North America in 1966-67 and by BT's 0800 Linkline services in the UK in 1985. A few Zenith, Commerce, WX or Enterprise numbers remain in service, but no more are being issued.
- A non-dialable Call Back Number (CBN) for Enhanced 9-1-1 is not a telephone number. It is a code to indicate the general location of a mobile caller to emergency dispatchers – usually identifying a specific tower, base station or latitude/longitude. This code, while formatted in a manner similar to a telephone number, does not identify a specific handset and therefore cannot be called directly nor through an operator.
