= Home Country Direct =

International telephone service for travelers

Home Country Direct (HCD) is an international telephone service that allows travelers abroad to connect with a telephone operator in their home country via a toll-free access number. The service enabled users to communicate with an operator speaking their native language, who could then place calls charged to a home-country account, telephone calling card, or collect billing arrangement.

== History ==
The first such services were introduced by AT&T in the early 1980s under the brand name USA Direct. This allowed American travelers to reach U.S.-based operators toll-free while overseas. Similar reciprocal services were subsequently launched by other national telecommunications providers, including British Telecom (“Home Direct”), NTT (“Japan Direct”), and Bell Canada (“Canada Direct”).

Because Home Country Direct predated the International Freephone Service (+800), each country had to assign a unique domestic toll-free number conforming to its own numbering plan. In some cases, the numbers were short codes accessible only from payphones, and callers were required to insert coins or use prepaid cards before connecting to the international operator.

Some service variants offered connections to third countries, often at higher tariffs, while others restricted use to specific caller types such as tourists or business travelers.

== Decline ==
By the late 1990s and early 2000s, the expansion of mobile phone networks, international roaming, and internet-based VoIP services such as Skype sharply reduced demand for Home Country Direct services. A number of carriers discontinued or consolidated their services, though some versions continued for specialized uses, including diplomatic or maritime communication channels.

== See also ==
- Collect call
- International telephone numbering plan
- Universal International Freephone Service
- Operator assistance
