= Donald Elliott =

Donald Elliott may refer to:

- Donald B. Elliott (1931–2024), member of the Maryland House of Delegates
- Donnie Elliott (born 1968), baseball player
- Donald R. Elliott, visual effects artist
- Don Elliott (1926–1984), American jazz musician
- Don Elliot Heald (1922–2009), American radio announcer
- Don Elliot (rower) (born 1929), English rower
- Donald H. Elliott (1932–2021), American urban planner
- Don Elliott (cricketer) from List of Rhodesian representative cricketers
