= Metro One Telecommunications =

Metro One Telecommunications, Inc.
- Type: Publicly listed
- Industry: Retail technology, Mobile commerce
- Founded: 1989
- Headquarters: Sheridan, Wyoming
- Area served: Worldwide
- Key people: Elchanan Maoz (Acting CEO, President), Jacqueline Danforth(CFO)
- Website: www.metro1telecomm.com

Metro One Telecommunications is a U.S-based company, headquartered in Sheridan, Wyoming. The company provides online and offline mobile commerce services to retailers.

== History ==
In 1989, the company was founded by Patrick M. Cox, Russell V. Davis and Kevin Anderson.

In 1996, the company became a public company via an initial public offering.

In 1999, the company reached an agreement to provide enhanced Directory Assistance services to Nextel Communications. In 2005, the contract was terminated by Sprint Corporation after its acquisition of Nextel.

In 2001, during the dot-com bubble, the company's market capitalization reached $1 billion.

In 2003, the company entered the consumer market with the launch of a 411 and concierge service called Infone. Infone was discontinued in December 2005.

In 2004, Duane Fromhart was named chief financial officer of the company.

In 2005, Kenneth Peterson acquired 8.8% of the company. In 2007, Peterson was named chairman of the company.

In March 2008, the company closed its call centers in Charlotte, North Carolina and Orlando.

The company liquidated its operating business in December 2008.

In December 2018, Metro One Telecommunications was acquired by Everest Fund; an investment company owned by Tel Aviv based special situations investor Elchanan Maoz, who is also the chairman of Metro One Telecommunications.

In March 2021, the company won the bid and acquired the assets of Israeli tech company Royal App Ltd and announced Bianca Meger as the CEO of Metro One Telecommunication.

In November 2021, the company raised $1.98 million by their first post-bankruptcy deal selling common stock and warrants.
