= Last-call return =

Feature giving details of the last call

Last-call return, automatic recall, or (on PBX and centrex service) camp-on, is a telecommunication feature offered by telephony service providers to subscribers to provide the subscriber with the telephone number, and sometimes the time, of the last caller. The service may also offer the facility to place a call to the calling party.

The general public tends to refer to the service by the telephone feature code, the telephone number it has in their country; for example, in North America, this is *69, while in the UK, it is called 1471. The New York Times described Call Return in 1992 as a new service. It can be paid for per-call or subscribed to monthly.

Example of Last-call return from Verizon Home Phone Service
Last-call return (with a fake NANP number, 987-654-3210). Voiced by Pat Fleet.

== Feature code ==
The number for this facility varies with country and provider:

- United States and Canada: Vertical service code *69; 1169 on rotary phone/pulse dial telephones. The prompt voice behind most U.S. AT&T implementations of this feature is Pat Fleet. Where available, it is offered on a per-call charge (typically 50¢) or an unlimited-use monthly subscription for a few dollars.
- Australia: *10# for Telstra services or *69 on Optus HFC Telephony network. This only allows one to return the last unanswered call, and can cost 35 cents per use.
- France: 3131
- Israel: *42
- Japan: 1361 to get number, 1363 to call back.
- United Kingdom: 1471 (also used in Gibraltar, Ireland, Isle of Man, Channel Islands, and the Falkland Islands)

In the UK, after dialing 1471, the caller can press "3" to automatically return the call. Previously free, since August 2004 the return call service incurs a charge.

The service provider may also offer a facility by which the calling party can prevent their number being revealed to the called party, either permanently or on a per-call basis. This is achieved by prefixing the dialed number with:

- Australia: 1831 on landlines and mobile phones, or #31# from a mobile
- United Kingdom, Ireland, Isle of Man, and Channel Islands: 141 on landlines and #31# on mobiles
- United States: *67
- Sweden: #31#

Conversely, to send the caller number on a line where the number is normally withheld, the following prefixes can be dialed:

- Australia: 1832 on landlines, or *31# from a mobile
- Ireland: 142
- United Kingdom: 1470 (also used in Gibraltar and the Channel Islands)
- United States: *82
- Philippines *999

In Gibraltar and formerly in Ireland, ex-directory or unlisted numbers are withheld by default.

In Germany, most contemporary telephones have a specific button functioning as call return, which is an internal function of the telephone itself (the number of the last caller is stored inside the phone at the time of that last call) and thus doesn't have a numeric code.

In Canada, the feature is commonly marketed by telephone companies as a combination of two features:

- Call again, a form of automatic ring back, allows a caller, on reaching a busy signal, to hang up, dial a special code, and be called back automatically when the called number is no longer busy, usually with a limit of 30 minutes.
- Call return allows a customer to dial a code that identifies the last incoming call. On some types of central office equipment, it announces the number and offers the call-back option; on others, it simply attempts a connection without an announcement.

== See also ==
- Vertical service code
