= Don Elliot Heald =

American broadcaster (1922–2009)

Don Elliot Heald (1922 – February 19, 2009) was an American broadcaster and broadcast executive. He was most known for his tenure as general manager of WSB-TV, the leading television station in Atlanta, and as the voice of time station WWV and the Audichron system used by time-and-temperature phone numbers in hundreds of cities.

== Early career and time at WSB-TV ==
Heald was born in 1922 in Concord, Massachusetts, and attended the University of Florida. There, he worked at the university's radio station, WRUF, and got into broadcasting. While at WRUF, the station manager encouraged him to drop his last name and go by Don Elliot on air, which he later regarded as a mistake. He graduated from the university and became an employee of a new Atlanta radio station, WCON, which began broadcasting on December 15, 1947; in 1949, he was promoted to news editor.

In 1950, The Atlanta Constitution, owner of WCON, merged with The Atlanta Journal, which shut down WCON in favor of keeping the Journal's WSB. Heald joined the staff of WSB's affiliated television station, starting as an announcer and being promoted to news editor the next year. Among the programs he hosted was Today in Georgia, a 9 a.m. morning program produced when WSB-TV sought not to air an hour of NBC's Today that was targeted at western states. In 1958, Heald was promoted to sales manager of WSB-TV and began using his full name again. Heald was appointed station manager in 1963 and, along with all the general managers of Cox Broadcasting stations at that time, was named a vice president in 1969. In 1974, Heald anchored WSB-TV's newscasts during a labor dispute.

Under Heald, WSB-TV hired the first Black reporter on Atlanta television news and, later, the first Black evening news anchor, Monica Kaufman Pearson. For most of this time, WSB-TV was Atlanta's top television station, only finding itself in a three-way ratings battle in the late 1970s when its network, NBC, faltered in the national ratings. In 1979, Heald announced his intention to retire in 1980, to coincide with 30 years with the WSB stations. He left the WSB-TV post at the end of 1979 but remained a vice president of Cox Broadcasting.

== Voiceover work ==
Heald's voice was used by Audichron, an Atlanta-based company, as the voice of time-and-temperature phone services in cities throughout the United States and beyond. In 1971, an Audichron representative estimated that 12 million calls a day were fielded by equipment in 600 cities using recordings of Heald's voice. Heald was one of several Atlantans who recorded material for the firm; other voices used by Audichron included Jane Barbe and John Doyle, a WSB-TV weatherman. Heald's voice was on Audichron equipment used by the National Bureau of Standards atomic clock broadcast on shortwave station WWV; WWVH, the time station in Hawaii, used Barbe's voice. In 1991, when the magnetic drum Audichron equipment was replaced with solid-state hardware utilizing digitized recordings, Doyle's voice replaced Heald's on WWV.

Heald was the longtime voice of The Protestant Hour, a long-running Atlanta radio ministry program which debuted in 1945. Heald became its announcer in 1948 after being recruited initially to do the Episcopal segments as a member of a local church.

== Post-retirement ventures ==
After retiring, Heald became an investor alongside Herman J. Russell and M. B. "Bud" Seretean in Russell-Rowe Communications, which won a construction permit to build a new television station in Macon, Georgia and, under another name, applied for channel 8 in Knoxville, Tennessee. Heald was named president of the Macon station, The station began broadcasting as WGXA on April 21, 1982. With Heald, Russell and Seretean in advanced age, the partners sold the station in 1995.

Heald was also involved in charitable ventures, including as president of the Peach Bowl and as chairman of the board of the American Cancer Society. Heald was credited with convincing the society to relocate its national headquarters from New York City to Atlanta in 1987.

== Personal life and death ==
Heald died of congestive heart failure on February 19, 2009, in Atlanta. He was survived by his wife, Sara Farmer Heald, as well as three sons and seven grandchildren.
