= Ringdown =

Method of signaling an operator in telephony

In telephony, ringdown is a method of signaling an operator in which telephone ringing current is sent over the line to operate a lamp or cause the operation of a self-locking relay known as a drop.

Ringdown is used in manual operation, and is distinguished from automatic signaling by dialing a number. The signal consists of a continuous or pulsed alternating current (AC) signal transmitted over the line. It may be used with or without a telephone switchboard. The term originated in magneto telephone signaling in which cranking the magneto generator, either integrated into the telephone set or housed in a connected ringer box, would not only ring its bell but also cause a drop to fall down at the telephone exchange switchboard, marked with the number of the line to which the magneto telephone instrument was connected. At the end of the conversation, one participant would crank to ring off, signaling the operator to take down the connection. In modern British English, "ring off" still means ending a telephone conversation, though it is of course done by other means. Ring off is also used figuratively to indicate no longer communicating with a person.

The last ringdown telephone exchange in the United States was located at Bryant Pond, Maine, had 400+ subscribers, and converted to dial service in October 1983.

== Ringdown operator ==
In telephone systems where calls from distant automated exchanges arrive for manual subscribers or non-dialable points, there often would be a ringdown operator (reachable from the distant operator console by dialling NPA+181) who would manually ring the desired subscriber on a party line or toll station. On some systems, this function was carried out by the inward operator (NPA+121). In both cases, this is a telephone operator at the destination who provides assistance solely to other operators on inbound toll calls; the ringdown operator nominally cannot be dialed directly by the subscriber.

== Non-operator use ==
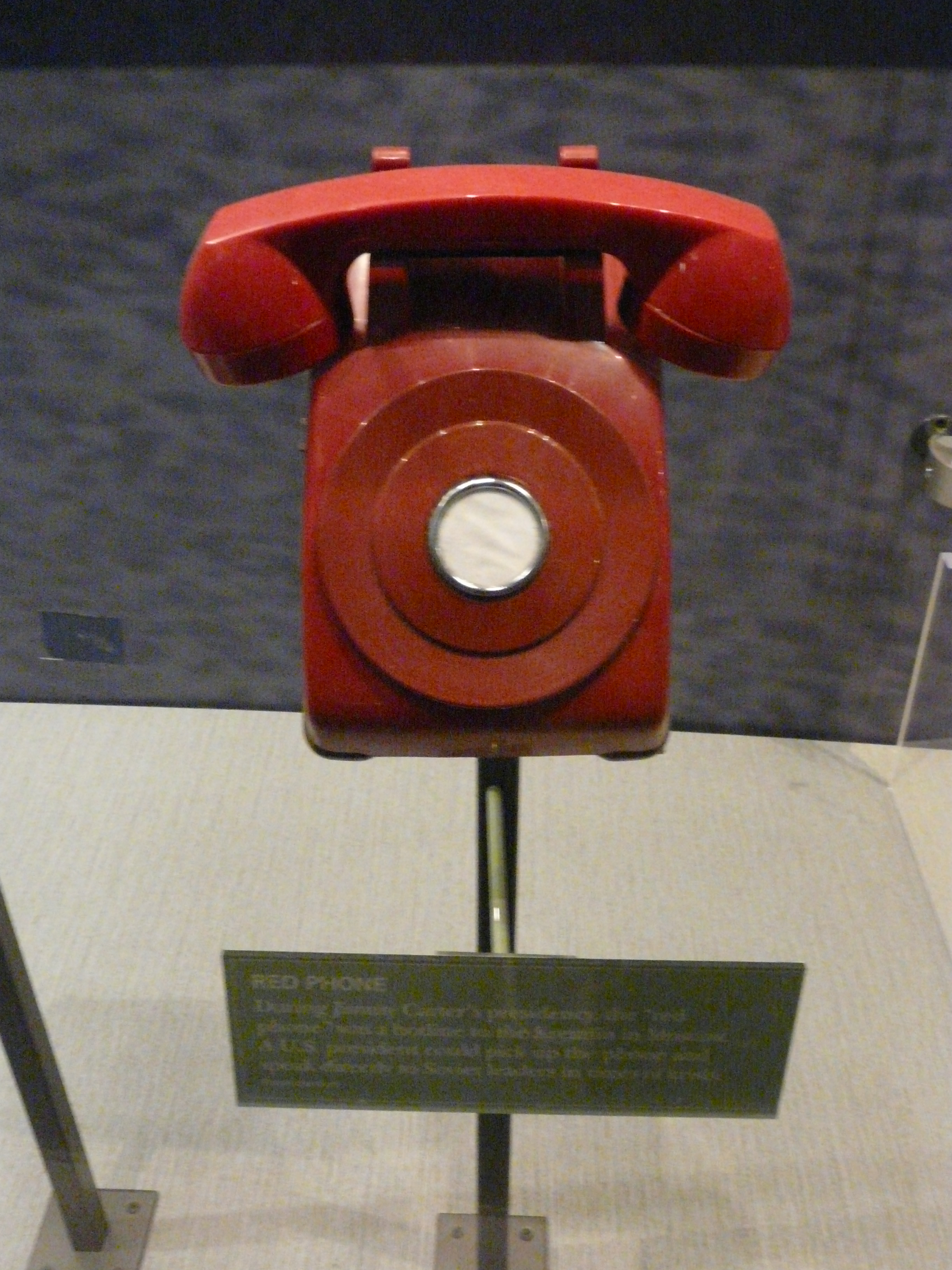
Hotline telephone without dial

In an application not involving a telephone operator, a two-point automatic ringdown circuit, or ringdown, has a telephone at each end. When the telephone at one end goes off-hook, the phone at the other end instantly rings. No dialing is involved and therefore telephone sets without dials are sometimes used.

Many ringdown circuits work in both directions. In some cases a circuit is designed to work in one direction only. That is, going off-hook at one end (end A) rings the other (end B). Going off-hook at end B has no effect at end A.

Ringdown features are often part of a key telephone system. In the wire spring relay key service units of the Bell System 1A2, a model 216 automatic ringdown was used to operate the circuit. In the 400-series units, a number of different KTUs operate (supervise) a ringdown, including the model 415. In other situations, the ringdown is powered and operated by equipment inside the telephone exchange.

In the case of enterprises with a private branch exchange (PBX) switch, the ringdown can be operated by the PBX key. The switch is programmed to ring a specific extension (the called phone) when a defined extension (the calling phone) goes off-hook. The PBX does not offer dial tone to the calling extension: it only detects on-hook or off-hook status.

Voice over IP adapters can be networked and configured to provide automatic ringdown by selecting a dial plan which replaces the empty string with a predefined number or SIP address, dialed immediately. (Some Cisco VoIP phones and analog adapters treat a dial plan of (S0 <:1234567890>) as a hotline configuration which dials 1-234-567890 zero seconds after the telephone is taken off-hook, for instance).

These circuits are used:

- over high-volume routes where one site calls another very frequently.

Example: an information desk and the information desk staff supervisor's desk.

- where a tamper-proof ability to call from one point to another is needed.

Example: a phone used to summon a taxicab to an airport or hotel.

- where a limited ability to contact one entity (but no ability to make outside calls) is desired.

Example: a "house phone" in a hotel lobby to the live operator at the hotel's switchboard

- where the public, or users that are not trained in using a specific office telephone system, must place calls.

Example: the after-hours phone to reach the watchman from the front door at a warehouse.

- in locations where emergencies are handled and the time required to dial digits would cause an unacceptable delay in handling of an emergency.

Example: an airport control tower to the airport's fire station or fire dispatch center.
Example: Independent System Operator (ISO) communication to a power plant.

- in situations where the called party needs to be certain of who is calling.

Example: a hospital emergency department and an ambulance dispatch center.

In some cases, automatic ringdown circuits have one-to-many configurations. When one phone goes off-hook, a group of phones is made to ring simultaneously.

In cases where one or both ends of the circuit terminate in a key telephone system, a well designed system will have no hold feature on the ringdown circuit unless supervision provides a Calling Party Control (CPC) signal.

== PLAR ==
Private line automatic ringdown (PLAR) is a type of analog signaling often used in telephone-based systems. When a device is taken off-hook, ringing voltage is automatically applied to a circuit to alert other stations on the line. When answered on another station, a call is maintained over the circuit. The telephone company switch is not involved in the process, making this a private line.

== See also ==
- Courtesy phone
- Dedicated line
