= Mary Moore (voice actor) =

American actress

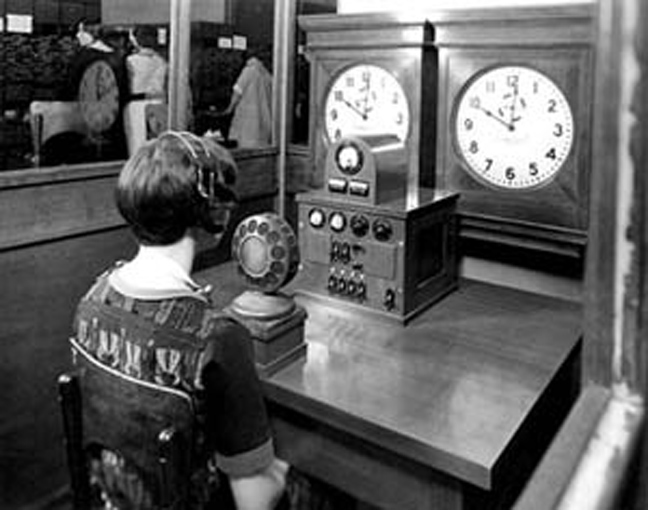
A human speaking clock prior to the invention of automated equipment.

In the United States of America, Mary Moore was the first national voice of the Bell System's standardized speaking clock and also provided the voice behind many telephone company recordings on equipment manufactured by Audichron.

Moore's voice was often recognized for the distinctive two-syllable pronunciations of 9 ("NY-un") and 5 ("FY-vuh"). This was a requirement of telephone operators at the time, because "nine" and "five" can sound very similar on a poor-quality line.

Prior to Moore's recordings and Audichron equipment, an operator stationed in a booth would await the glow of a signal lamp, indicating that a subscriber had dialed the service; she (or, sometimes, he) would then announce the time at 10-second intervals until the lamp was extinguished. Callers reaching a disconnected number would be informed by the operator personally. Moore had one of these reading jobs herself before she was formally recorded.

== See also ==
- Jane Barbe
- Pat Fleet
- Joanne Daniels

Preceded by Post created	Voice of AT&T c. 1934 - January 1, 1963	Succeeded by Jane Barbe
