= Talking clock =

Clock offering auditory output

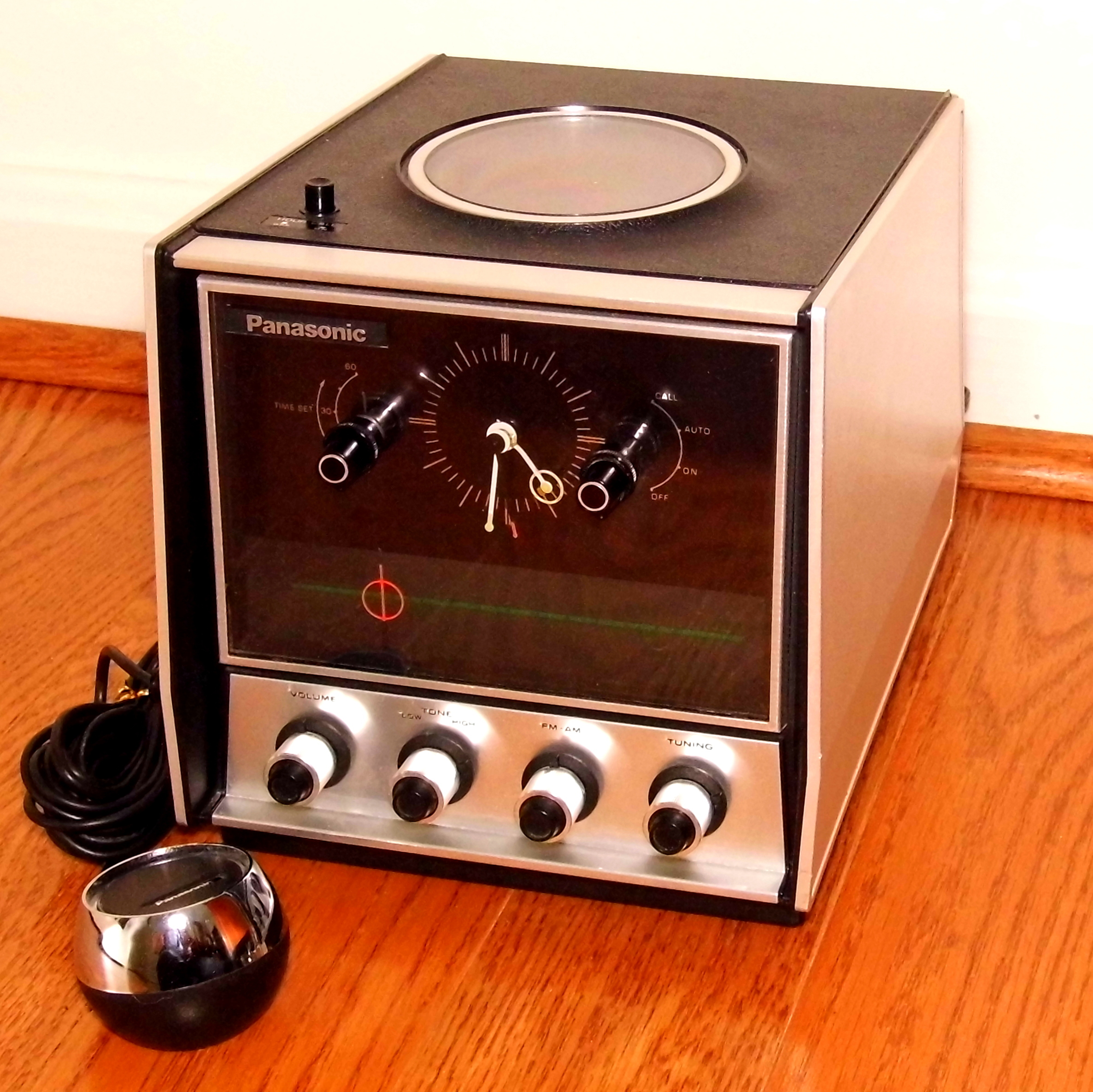
1971 Panasonic Tele-Talk FM-AM Talking Clock Radio

A talking clock (also called a speaking clock and an auditory clock) is a timekeeping device that presents the time as sounds. It may present the time solely as sounds, such as a phone-based time service (see "Speaking clock") or a clock for the visually impaired, or may have a sound feature in addition to an analog or digital face.

== History ==
Although they would not be considered to be speaking, clocks have incorporated noisemakers such as clangs, chimes, gongs, melodies, and the sounds of cuckoos or roosters from almost the beginning of the mechanical clock. Soon after Thomas Edison's invention of the phonograph, the earliest attempts to make a clock that incorporated a voice were made. Around 1878, Frank Lambert invented a machine that used a voice recorded on a lead cylinder to call out the hours. Lambert used lead in place of Edison's soft tinfoil. In 1992, the Guinness Book of World Records recognized this as the oldest known sound recording that was playable (though that status now rests with a phonautogram of Édouard-Léon Scott de Martinville, recorded in 1857). It is on display at the National Watch and Clock Museum in Columbia, Pennsylvania.

Although there have been rumors that other talking clocks may have been produced afterward, it is not until around 1910 that another talking clock was introduced, when Bernhard Hiller created a clock that used a belt with a recording on it to announce the time. However, these belts were often broken by the hand-tightening required, and all attempts to reproduce the celluloid ribbon have so far failed.

In 1933, the first practical use of talking clocks was seen when Ernest Esclangon created a talking telephone time service in Paris, France. On its first day, February 14, 1933, more than 140,000 calls were received. London began a similar service three years later. This type of talking time service is still around, and more than a million calls per year are received for the NIST's Telephone Time-of-Day Service.

In 1954, Ted Duncan, Inc., released the Hickory Dickory Clock, a crank toy intended for children. This clock used a record, needle, and tone arm to produce its sound.

In 1968, the first truly portable talking clock, the Mattel-a-Time Talking Clock, was released.

In 1979, Sharp released the world's first quartz-based talking clock, the Talking Time CT-660E (German version CT-660G). Its silver transistor-radio-like case contained complex LSI circuitry with 3 SMD ICs (likely clock CPU, speech CPU and sound IC), producing a Speak&Spell-like synthetic voice. At the front rim was a small LCD. The alarm spoke the time and also had a melody "Boccherini's Minuet"; after 5 minutes the alarm repeated with the words "Please hurry!". It also had stopwatch and countdown timer modes. The tiny controls to turn off alarm or set functions are hard to reach under a small bottom lid.

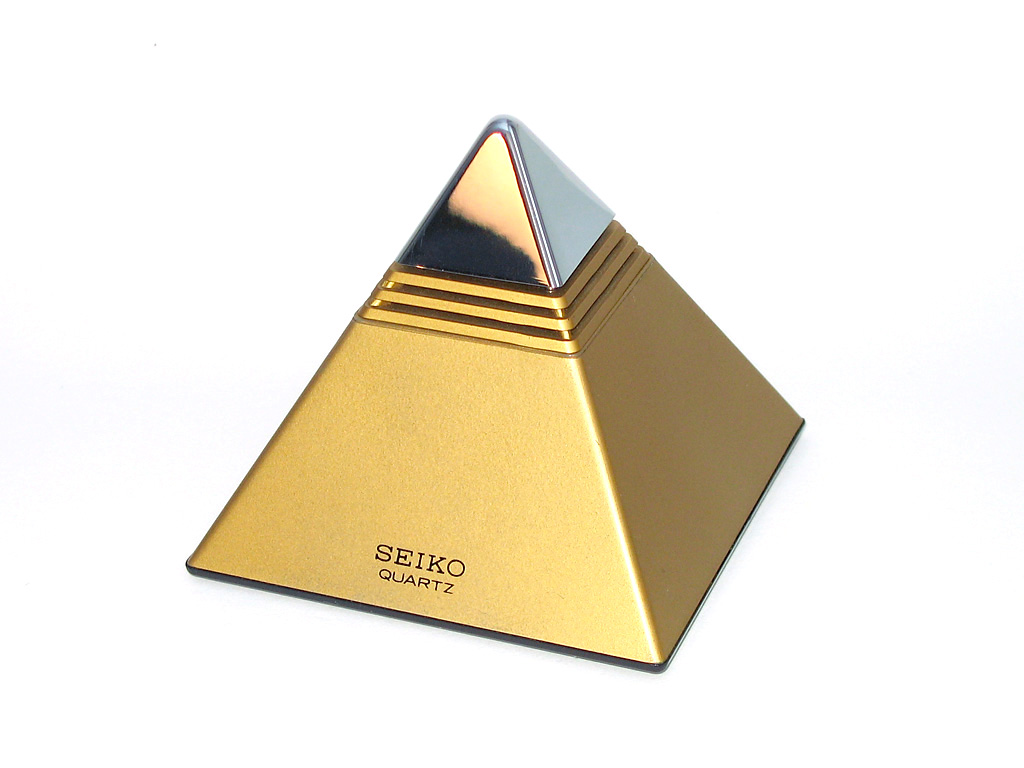
Seiko "Pyramid Talk" clock

In 1984, the Hattori Seiko Co. released their famous pyramid-shaped talking clock, the Pyramid Talk. As a futuristic design object even its LCD was hidden at the bottom, requiring the user to push the clock's top to hear it talk.

Current talking clocks often include many more features than just giving the time; in these, the ability to speak the time is part of a wide range of voice capabilities, such as reading the weather and other information to the user.

== Uses and purposes ==
=== Teaching timetelling ===
After the telephone time service, the next practical application of the talking clock was in the teaching of timetelling to children. The first talking clock to be used for this purpose was the Mattel "Mattel-a-Time Talking Clock" of 1968. Several other clocks of this type followed, including one featuring Thomas the Tank Engine. One of the latest ones, the "Talking Clever Clock", includes a quiz button which asks questions such as "What time is it?", "What time will it be in an hour?", and "How much time has passed between 1:00 and 2:30?" Other educational talking clocks come in a kit designed to be assembled by children.

Talking clocks can also be used with children whose learning disabilities may be partially offset by the reinforcement provided by hearing the time as well as seeing it.

=== Assisting the blind ===
Talking clocks have found a natural home as an assistive technology for people who are blind or visually impaired. There are over 150 tabletop clocks and 50 types of watches that talk. Manufacturers of such clocks include Sharp, Panasonic, RadioShack, and Reizen. In addition, one manufacturer purportedly produced a clock that would announce the time upon detecting a user's whistling signal.

=== Branding/Advertising ===
Many companies have used talking clocks as a novelty item to promote their brand. In 1987, the H. J. Heinz Company released a clock with the figure of "Mr. Aristocrat", a tomato with a motif similar to Mr. Peanut. At alarm time, the clock said, "It's time to get up; get up right away! Wait any longer and it's 'ketchup' all day! Remember, Heinz is the thick rich one." At roughly the same time, Pillsbury created a similar clock with the character of Little Sprout. In recent years, the Coca-Cola polar bear, the Red and Yellow M&M's characters, the Pillsbury Doughboy, a Campbell's Soup girl, and others have at one time appeared on a talking clock. One of the more interesting branded clocks was produced by Energizer and was a soft, battery-shaped clock whose alarm was turned off by punching it or throwing it against a hard surface.

=== Entertainment/conversation pieces ===
The inexpensiveness of modern speech technology has allowed manufacturers to include talking clock capabilities into a wide range of products. Many of these are intended as conversation pieces or speak merely for the entertainment of hearing sounds or words spoken by an inanimate object. Such timepieces include Darth Vader clocks, calculators with time features, and even a painting of Leonardo da Vinci's The Last Supper that announces the time on the hour along with a quote from Jesus.

Other themes of talking timepieces include fortune-telling, astrology, clocks with moving lips, animated creatures, sports and athletes, and movies, among others.

== Technology ==
Most modern talking clocks are based on speech-synthesis integrated circuits that generate speech from sampled, stored data. The rapid technological progress of the 1980s enabled today's high-quality talking products. Early talking clocks employed chips that linked phonemes to generate speech. These products could generate unlimited speech, but it was of relatively poor quality that sounded robotic, at worst, unintelligible. Today's higher-quality speech is produced by sampled-data systems that take elements of an actual human voice. Modern voice synthesis technologies can produce synthesized vocabularies that retain the style of the speaker exactly and are not limited to just perfect English, but can be as varied as Scottish accents, Japanese, and even the voice of a young child. Such voices are all generated using tiny, inexpensive voice chips that are readily available.

Almost all of the latest voice-chipped talking clocks incorporate the female human voice to announce the time. Dr. Mark McKinley, the president of the International Society of Talking Clock Collectors, proposes three possible explanations for this phenomenon. The female voice may be considered more soothing psychologically; it may be a relic of the female voice being historically associated with secretarial (Administrative Assistant) functions; or a feminine voice may possibly simply be softer in a less intrusive way.

Many talking clocks include a light sensor or a setting that will automatically silence them between certain hours (usually between 10 p.m. and 8 a.m.).

=== Ozen Box ===
Many talking clocks of the 1970s utilized an Ozen box, which is a mechanism similar to a phonograph, in which a needle-like stylus tracks on a 2.25 inch platter similar to a vinyl phonograph record. The Janex Corporation produced most of the clocks which use this device, and they are highly prized among collectors.

== Characters ==
A very large number of popular characters have appeared on talking clocks. The following list is not exhaustive, nor is it intended to be — the International Society of Talking Clocks Collectors (ISTCC) has a Museum collection of over 800 talking clocks.

- Mickey Mouse
- Several Looney Tunes characters (including Bugs Bunny, Daffy Duck, Tweety, et al.)
- The Simpsons
- Strawberry Shortcake
- Superheroes (including Superman, Spider-Man, The Incredible Hulk, et al.)
- Furby
- Biz Markie
- The Smurfs
- SpongeBob SquarePants
- Mario

== See also ==
- Speaking clock
