= Oficjalny słownik polskiego scrabblisty =

Word authority for Scrabble played in Poland

Oficjalny słownik polskiego scrabblisty ("The official dictionary of Polish scrabble players", abbreviated as OSPS) is a publication containing all Polish words allowed in the game of Scrabble in Polish. It is co-published by the Polish Scrabble Federation (Polish: Polska Federacja Scrabble) and the Polish Scientific Publishers PWN. It is also the first dictionary intended to cover a relatively complete range of Polish vocabulary in all conjugations.

The first edition of OSPS was published in 1998, with the second published in 2005. Both versions are available in electronic version (CD-ROM). The dictionary contains all words from selected PWN dictionaries published after 1980, as well as selected words from the 11-volume Dictionary of the Polish Language (Polish: Słownika języka polskiego) edited by Witold Doroszewski.
