= Telephone switchboard =

Device used to connect telephone circuits to establish calls between users

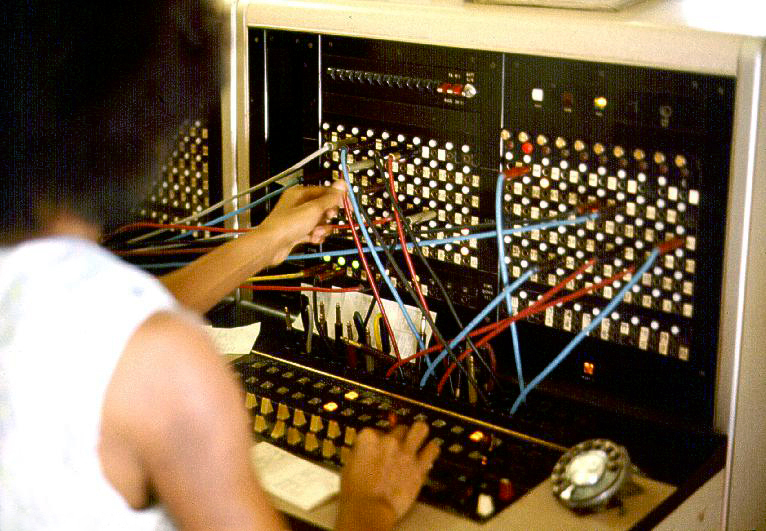
PBX switchboard, 1975

A telephone switchboard is a device used to connect circuits of telephones to establish telephone calls between users or other switchboards. The switchboard is an essential component of a manual telephone exchange, and is operated by switchboard operators who use electrical cords or switches to establish the connections.

The switchboard saw the peak of its use in the 20th century before wider adoption of the electromechanical automatic telephone exchange. The automatic exchange, invented by Almon Strowger in 1888, has replaced most switchboards in central telephone exchanges around the world.

Nevertheless, many manual branch exchanges remained operational into the second half of the 20th century in many enterprises. Some establishments, such as the White House, still operate a switchboard.

Electronic devices and computer technology have given exchange operators more features. For example, a private branch exchange (PBX) in a business usually has an attendant console, or an auto-attendant function, which bypasses the operator.

== History ==
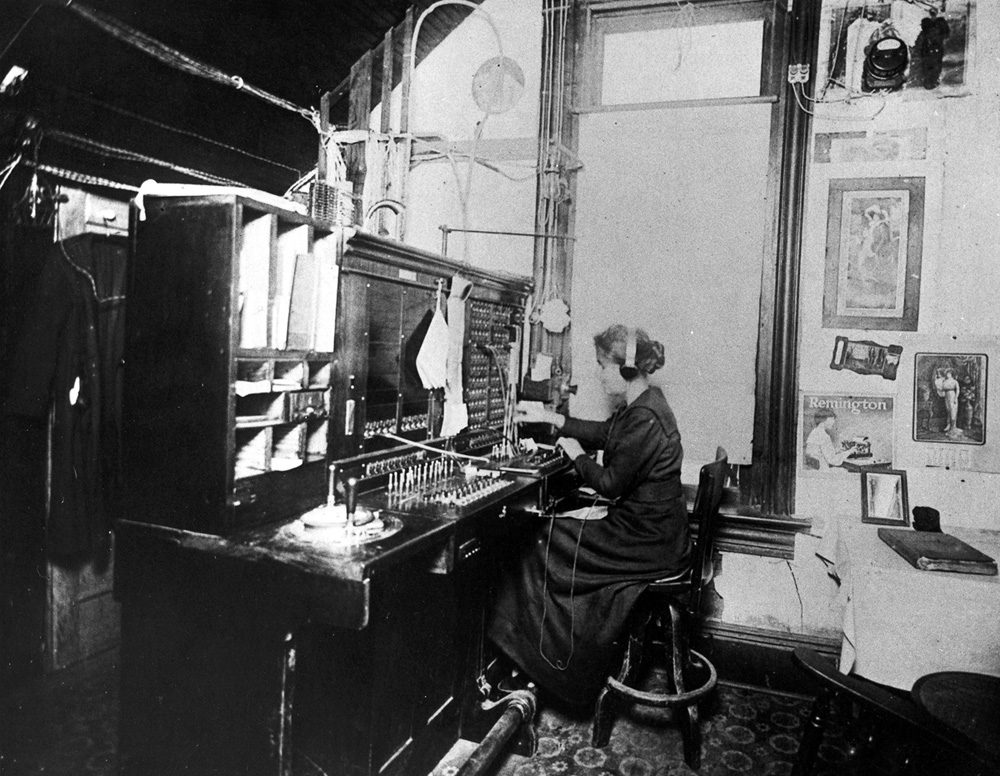
Telephone operator, c. 1900

Following the invention of the telephone in 1876, the first telephones were rented in pairs which were limited to conversation between the parties operating those two instruments. The use of a central exchange was soon found to be even more advantageous than in telegraphy.

In May 1877, the Holmes Burglar Alarm Company in Boston, Massachusetts, established by Edwin T. Holmes, installed the first central office and switchboard that served both as a security service at night for banks and businesses, as well as a telephone system. The switchboard operated telephone instruments manufactured by Charles Williams, a licensee of the Alexander Graham Bell company.

In January 1878 the Boston Telephone Dispatch company had started hiring boys as telephone operators. Boys had been very successful as telegraphy operators, but their attitude, lack of patience, and behavior was unacceptable for live telephone contact, so the company began hiring women operators instead. Thus, on September 1, 1878, Boston Telephone Dispatch hired Emma Nutt as the first woman operator. Small towns typically had the switchboard installed in the operator's home so that he or she could answer calls on a 24-hour basis. In 1894, New England Telephone and Telegraph Company installed the first battery-operated switchboard on January 9 in Lexington, Massachusetts.

Early switchboards in large cities usually were mounted floor to ceiling in order to allow the operators to reach all the lines in the exchange. The operators were boys who would use a ladder to connect to the higher jacks. Late in the 1890s this measure failed to keep up with the increasing number of lines, and Milo G. Kellogg devised the Divided Multiple Switchboard for operators to work together, with a team on the "A board" and another on the "B". These operators were almost always women until the early 1970s, when men were once again hired. Cord switchboards were often referred to as "cordboards" by telephone company personnel. Conversion to panel switch and other automated switching systems first eliminated the "B" operator and then, usually years later, the "A". Rural and suburban switchboards for the most part remained small and simple. In many cases, customers knew their operator by name.

As telephone exchanges converted to automatic (dial) service, switchboards continued to serve specialized purposes. Before the advent of direct-dialed long-distance calls, a subscriber would need to contact the long-distance operator in order to place a toll call. In large cities, there was often a special number, such as 211 or 110, which would ring the long-distance operator directly. Elsewhere, the subscriber would ask the local operator to ring the long-distance operator.

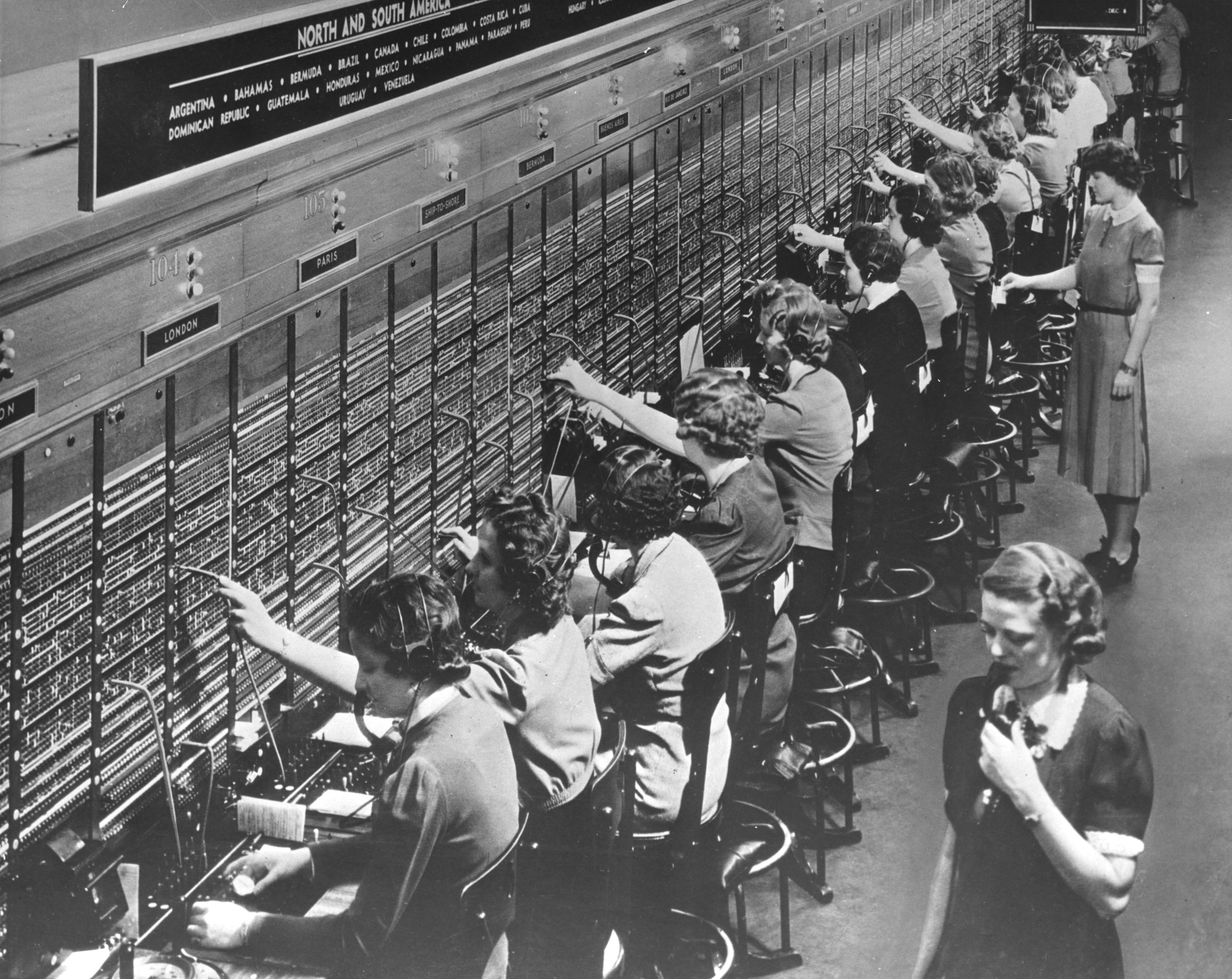
A large Bell System international switchboard in 1943

The long-distance operator would record the name and city of the person to be called, and the operator would advise the calling party to hang up and wait for the call to be completed. Each toll center had only a limited number of trunks to distant cities, and if those circuits were busy, the operator would try alternate routings through intermediate cities. The operator would plug into a trunk for the destination city, and the inward operator would answer. The inward operator would obtain the number from the local information operator and ring the call. Once the called party answered, the originating operator would advise him or her to stand by for the calling party, whom she'd then ring back, and record the starting time once the conversation began.

In the 1940s, with the advent of dial pulse and multi-frequency operator dialing, the operator would plug into a tandem trunk and dial the NPA (area code) and operator code for the information operator in the distant city. For instance, the New York City information operator was 212-131. If the customer knew the number, and the point was direct-dialable, the operator would dial the call. If the distant city did not have dialable numbers, the operator would dial the code for the inward operator serving the called party, and ask her to ring the number.

A telephone switchboard at the headquarters of No. 60 Group RAF during World War II

In the 1960s, once most phone subscribers had direct long-distance dialing, a single type of operator began to serve both the local and long-distance functions. A customer might call to request a collect call, a call billed to a third number, or a person-to-person call. All toll calls from coin phones required operator assistance. The operator was also available to help complete a local or long-distance number which did not complete. For example, if a customer encountered a reorder tone (a fast busy signal), it could indicate "all circuits busy," or a problem in the destination exchange. The operator might be able to use a different routing to complete the call. If the operator could not get through by dialing the number, she could call the inward operator in the destination city, and ask her to try the number, or to test a line to see if it was busy or out of order.

Cord switchboards used for these purposes were replaced in the 1970s and 1980s by Traffic Service Position System (TSPS) and similar systems, which greatly reduced operator involvement in calls. The customer would, instead of simply dialing "0" for the operator, dial 0+NPA+7digits, after which an operator would answer and provide the desired service (coin collection, obtaining acceptance on a collect call, etc.), and then release the call to be automatically handled by the TSPS.

Before the late 1970s and early 1980s, it was common for many smaller cities to have their own operators. An NPA (area code) would usually have its largest city as its primary toll center, with smaller toll centers serving the secondary cities scattered throughout the NPA. TSPS allowed telephone companies to close smaller toll centers and consolidate operator services in regional centers which might be hundreds of miles from the subscriber.

In the mid-1980s the Bell Operating Companies (BOCs) opened their own Operator Services offices with a system called TOPS (Traffic Operator Position System) to act as local and intraLATA telephone operators. With this the BOCs took intraLATA call traffic from AT&T as well as services which were once provided on a cordboard (Toll Stations, Mobile and Marine [Ship-to-Shore]). Operators from AT&T returned to work for the BOC as the intraLATA traffic was cut to the BOC.

In the early 1990s AT&T replaced TSPS with OSPS (Operator Services Position System). The OSPS position was a computer terminal which the AT&T operator entered billing information. With the advent of OSPS a feature called Interflow allowed operators on a system to answer calls from anywhere within their region.

As technology changed, so did the application of Interflow. Interflow was implemented nationwide by AT&T. This allowed AT&T to close virtually every operator office throughout the US. As of 2004 the only AT&T operator offices remaining were located in Houston, Texas, and Jacksonville, Florida.

== Operation ==
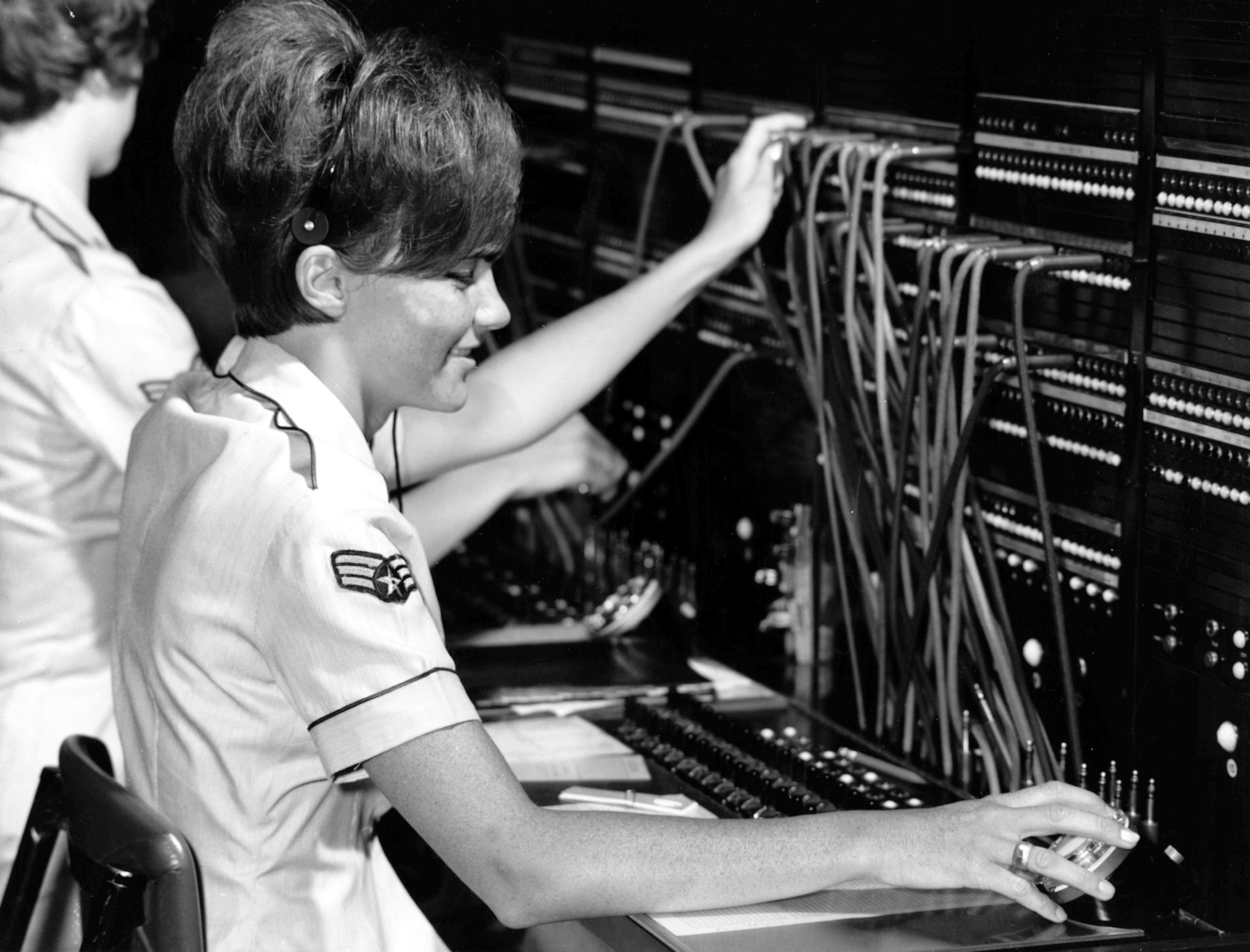
U.S. Air Force operator works a switchboard in the underground command post at Strategic Air Command headquarters, Offutt Air Force Base, Nebraska in 1967.

The switchboard is usually designed to accommodate the operator, who sits facing it. It has a high back panel, which consists of rows of female jacks, each jack designated and wired as a local extension of the switchboard (which serves an individual subscriber) or as an incoming or outgoing trunk line. The jack is also associated with a lamp.

On the table, or desk area, in front of the operator are columns of three-position toggle switches, termed keys, lamps, and cords. Each column consists of a front key and a rear key, a front lamp and a rear lamp, followed by a front cord and a rear cord, making up together a cord circuit. The front key is the talk key, allowing the operator to speak with the user(s) of the line(s) the corresponding cord pair is connected to. The rear key on older "manual" boards and PBXs is used to ring a telephone. On newer boards, the back key is used to collect (retrieve) money from coin telephones. Each of the keys has three positions: back, normal and forward. When a key is in the normal position an electrical talk path connects the front and rear cords. A key in the forward position (front key) connects the operator to the cord pair, and a key in the back position sends a ring signal out on the cord (on older manual exchanges). Each cord has a three-wire TRS phone connector: tip and ring for testing, ringing and voice; and a sleeve wire for busy signals.

When a call is received, a jack lamp lights on the back panel and the operator responds by placing the rear cord into the corresponding jack and throwing the front key forward. The operator then converses with the caller, who informs the operator to whom he or she would like to speak. If it is another extension, the operator places the front cord in the associated jack and pulls the front key backwards to ring the called party. After connecting, the operator leaves both cords "up" with the keys in the normal position so the parties can converse. The supervision lamps light to alert the operator when the parties finish their conversation and go on-hook. Either party could "flash" the operator's supervision lamps by depressing their switch hook for a second and releasing it, in case they needed assistance with a problem. When the operator pulls down a cord, a pulley weight behind the switchboard pulls it down to prevent it from tangling.

On a trunk, on-hook and off-hook signals must pass in both directions. In a one-way trunk, the originating, or A, board shorts the line pair together (sends a short) for off-hook and disconnects (sends an open) for on-hook, while the terminating, or B, board sends normal polarity or reverse polarity. This "reverse battery" signaling was carried over to later automatic exchanges.

Some areas used specialized switchboards to handle calls from payphones. In North America, these "coin boards" were gradually phased out after the introduction of the Automated Coin Toll System that was provided by the Traffic Service Position System. Dedicated coin boards were primarily used in large, densely populated areas such as New York City where the large local calling area required special billing arrangements to allow the rate for a local call to vary based on the distance called. In less densely populated regions, calls from payphones were handled by normal assistance operators without the use of dedicated coin boards.

== See also ==
- Telephone in United States history
