= Joanne Daniels =

American voice actress (1931–2023)

Joanne Good Daniels (September 12, 1931 – February 20, 2023) was an American voice actress. She was best known as the voice of telephone company time and temperature announcements for the Weatherchron company of Atlanta, Georgia (a competitor of Audichron), used in various parts of the United States including Los Angeles, California and Northern California.

She also provided the voice for British Telecom, and a significant number of number change announcements. Automated messages advising callers that the number had been changed and what the new number was were concatenated from recorded samples of her pronouncing the digits and other relevant phrases.

Daniels died on February 20, 2023, at the age of 92.

== Other notable appearances ==
Daniels, as the time lady, is the first voice heard in the opening sequence of Real Time with Bill Maher.

== See also ==
- Jane Barbe
- Pat Fleet
