= Operator Services Position System =

Telephone operator workstation developed by AT&T

The Operator Services Position System (OSPS) is a telephone operator workstation developed by AT&T as part of the 5ESS switch platform. It provides call‑processing functions for operator services using ISDN facilities to deliver data and voice to operator positions.

== Background ==
OSPS succeeded the Traffic Service Position System (TSPS), introduced roughly four decades earlier to replace manual cord switchboards. TSPS standardized operator workflows and introduced automated call‑handling functions.

In 1986, AT&T introduced the Computerized Position Information System (COMPIS), which added a video display terminal and movable keyboard to the TSPS environment. Although intended for limited use during an operator’s shift, COMPIS was increasingly used for a larger share of operator tasks, exceeding the ergonomic assumptions of its design. COMPIS served as an interim system prior to OSPS deployment.

== Design and features ==
OSPS was developed with attention to human factors considerations, including standardized call‑keying procedures and a display layout intended to support sustained operator use. The system uses the distributed architecture of the 5ESS switch and ISDN facilities to provide simultaneous voice and data connections to operator positions. An Automatic Call Distributor (ACD) is used to route calls among operator groups.

OSPS supports toll, assistance, and directory‑listing services. System functions include interflow (allowing calls to be answered across a region), More Efficient Call Handling (MECH), and combined toll‑and‑listing workflows. Additional functions include anti‑fraud tools, trunk offering, and charge‑and‑duration information.

Both TSPS and OSPS were produced by AT&T Network Systems. In these systems, operators are connected to calls only during setup, reducing the amount of operator time required per call compared with earlier manual switchboards.

OSPS entered large‑scale deployment beginning in 1990, replacing TSPS installations at AT&T facilities in the United States. It remained AT&T’s primary operator‑services platform from the late 1980s until around 2016.

== See also ==
- Traffic Service Position System
- 5ESS switch
- Telephone operator
- Human factors and ergonomics
