= Operator assistance =

Call assistance services

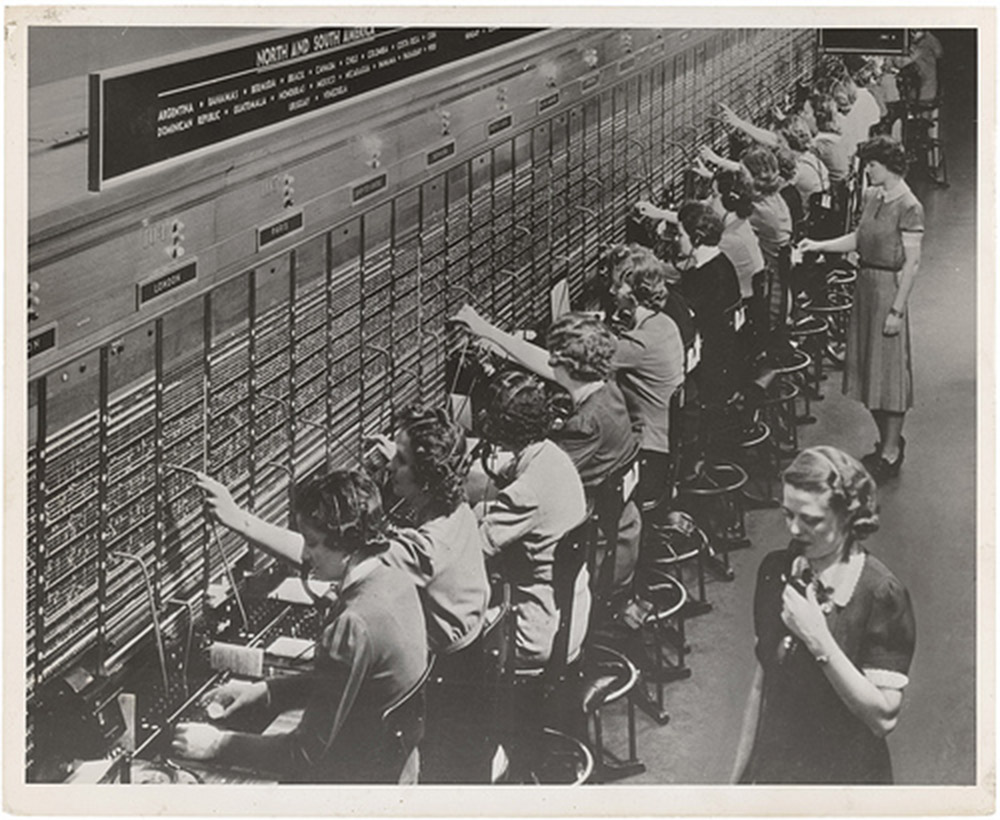
Bell System overseas switchboard operators during World War II

Operator assistance refers to service provided by a telephone operator to the calling party of a telephone call. This included telephone calls made from pay phones, calls placed station-to-station, person-to-person, or collect, third-number calls, calls billed to credit cards, and certain international calls which could not be dialed directly.

Operators could also assist with diagnosing technical difficulties, verifying whether a line was busy (busy line verification, or BLV), or left off the hook, or breaking in on a live call to ask the caller to clear the line for an incoming call (busy line interruption, or BLI). The latter service was often utilized by emergency police. In addition, operators were often a first point of contact for the elderly wanting information on the current date and time.

Before the advent of emergency telephone numbers, operators identified and connected emergency calls to the correct emergency services. Directory assistance was also part of the operator's job.

In the early days of telephones all calls were connected by an operator. Later, local calls could typically be dialed directly, but long-distance and international calls had to be connected by an operator, often subject to a minimum charge, typically for three minutes. Eventually it became possible to direct-dial all calls, but operator assistance continued to be available, often at higher cost, for all calls; in the US Bell System an operator-assisted call carried a 50% premium for the first three minutes.

Operator-assisted calls were initially handled at telephone switchboards which were subsequently replaced with computer assisted systems such as Traffic Service Position System (TSPS) consoles beginning in the late 1960s, which automated many aspects of call setup while still requiring operator involvement for billing verification, announcements, and customer interaction.

== Connection ==
=== Station-to-station ===
A station-to-station call, also known as station paid or station collect depending on the billing arrangement, was an operator-assisted call in which the calling party (CLG) agreed to talk to whoever answered the telephone. Timing and billing began as soon as the call was answered, regardless of who picked up.

=== Person-to-person ===
A person-to-person call, also known as person paid or person collect depending on the billing arrangement, was a higher priced operator-assisted call in which the calling party required to speak to a specific named party and not simply to anyone who answered. The caller was only charged for the call from the moment the requested party was reached, and was not charged at all if the party was unreachable.

An operator would typically announce the call to the answering party with the phrase "(Called Party), please. Long Distance is calling."

Bell System operating practice set a holding interval — the maximum time an operator would wait for the called party to come to the telephone or while a collect-call acceptance was sought. This interval was originally three minutes but was reduced to one minute by 1973 to improve network efficiency; operators could wait longer if either party requested it. At the one-minute mark on a person-to-person call the prescribed phrase was: "I am sorry, I have not yet reached [called party]. Will you speak to anyone else, or shall I leave word?" On a station collect call, if no one had accepted or refused the charge after one minute, the operator was required to release the circuit, as the connection could not be held indefinitely on a station call.

==== Messenger call ====
When waiting for the person would exceed the holding interval, a messenger call was used. In areas with minimal telephone service such as smaller towns (and before the ubiquity of mobile phones), a call was made to a normally staffed central location with a telephone, such as a corner store, public call office, post office, or other public business, and a messenger would be hired to go to the recipient's location to advise him or her to come to the phoned location at a designated time to receive a phone call. The calling party would be advised to call the operator back at the arranged time to complete the call.

==== Sequence call ====
Prior to direct distance dialing, placing a long distance call often required an operator to take down the call information and call the customer back when ready. Looking up routing codes and preparing billing tickets often took several minutes or more depending on circuit and staff availability.

Customers requesting two or more simultaneous calls from the same telephone were offered the option of a sequence call, handled by a dedicated sequence operator. A list of numbers to be called would be shared with the operator in advance, giving the operator time to look up routing codes and prepare billing tickets for all calls at once, significantly speeding overall call completion for the customer compared to handling each request separately. The calling party would hook flash to indicate the desire to move to the next call in the list.

=== Emergency ===
Before the establishment of uniform emergency telephone numbers, operators were responsible for connecting emergency calls to police, fire, ambulance, hospitals, civil defense, and military authorities. Operators were trained to advance emergency calls without delay, not stopping to ask questions unless the caller specifically requested that the operator make the report; in that case the operator obtained the calling number, location, and nature of the emergency and said "I will report it for you." On calls from coin telephones, operators did not delay an emergency call to collect a deposit; on local coin calls to police, sheriff, and fire departments, no charge was assessed at all. If the called emergency number was busy, the operator offered to interrupt the conversation. In localities where no ambulance service was available, operators were instructed to connect to the police department instead.

=== Inward ===
Inward referred to calls arriving from other operators, usually in a different geographic region.

Certain types of calls could only be completed by a local operator, for example in systems without dial service or to non-dialable points, therefore inbound long distance calls would also require the local operator for call completion. A local or inward operator was reached by using an inward route, for example, in the United States, an area code followed by 121.

Because the incoming call arrived on a trunk designated for inward traffic, the answering (or "inward") operator would recognize it as an operator-to-operator request and would assist in completing the final leg(s) of the connection, either directly, to ringdown circuits and toll stations, or to other operators in nearby smaller exchanges without long distance trunks.

== Supplementary ==
=== Time and charges (T&C) ===
The time and charges for a call could be reported back to a requesting party as the duration in minutes and the completed call charge. Requested before a call began, it was sometimes used by house guests to reimburse hosts for use of their telephone, and was almost always required by hotel switchboard operators to charge room guests for calls they made.

In the Bell System, T&C could be requested by either the calling or called party. If the requesting party disconnected before the call ended, the operator prepared a memo and if neither party could be reached after initial attempts, the memo ticket was filed for follow-up.

=== Busy line verification ===
Busy line verification (BLV) was a service in which an operator checked the condition of a called line at the request of a caller or distant operator who had been unable to get through. The operator accessed the line via a dedicated test trunk and reported back the condition encountered.

Bell System operating practice required operators to report the result in one of three ways depending on what they found: a busy signal, an equipment trouble condition, or an emergency. Operators were explicitly prohibited from telling a customer that a line was "off the hook", on the grounds that the actual trouble condition—which might be equipment failure rather than a handset left off-hook—could not be determined from the busy-no-tone (BNT) signal alone; the prescribed phrase was "There seems to be trouble on the line, I'll report it for you", after which the operator made out a trouble ticket. Operators were equally prohibited from disclosing to a caller that a conversation was in progress on the verified line. Adverse publicity received by Mountain Bell in late 1973 resulted from an operator who, when asked to verify a doctor's office line, volunteered "It takes me three days to reach my doctor"—a remark characterized in internal bulletins as "completely uncalled for."

== Billing ==
Calls were typically billed to the subscriber or calling party (CLG), but operators could also make arrangements to bill charges elsewhere and issue credits for errors. Beginning in the late 1960s automated services such as the Traffic Service Position System and the Automated Coin Toll System began to assist with much of this work.

=== Collect / Reverse Charge ===
A collect call was any call type where the called party (CLD) was billed for the call rather than the calling party (CLG). The operator first obtained the calling party's name, and requested acceptance of charges by the called party before leaving the line. If the called party refused, the operator returned to the calling party to ask whether they would pay the charges themselves; if not, the call was canceled. Collect calls to coin phones were typically not permitted and were prevented by checking the called number against a list of coin phones in the called area.

Standard Bell System phrases used by operators included: "I have a collect call for anyone, from (calling party). Will you accept the charge?" or, when a specific party was requested, "I have a collect call for (called party), from (calling party). Will you accept the charge?"

==== Non-published Collect ====
Callers could request that a collect call be marked as non-published, causing the originating telephone number to be omitted or partially masked on the billed party's statement. This protected the privacy of the calling subscriber while still allowing the charges to be billed to the called party. The feature was commonly used by professionals or individuals who wished to avoid revealing a residential telephone number, particularly when conducting business from home. In such cases, the statement would display only the city or exchange of origin, or a generic notation such as "non-published number", instead of the complete telephone number.

=== Auto Collect ===
The service functioned as an early form of a toll-free telephone number, enabling businesses, transportation providers, government agencies, and customer service organizations to receive inbound calls from remote locations with no charge to the caller.

==== Special exchange (e.g. Zenith, Enterprise, WX, Freephone) ====
Zenith telephone number listing in a 1938 Southern California telephone directory.

The caller requested a published or advertised number beginning with a special named exchange—such as Zenith, Enterprise, Freephone, or WX—from the telephone operator, who then looked up the destination number, completed the call, and billed the charges to the called party. The service was intended for organizations that wanted to be reachable across multiple regions without requiring local branch lines or dedicated foreign exchange circuits.

A few organizations continued to maintain auto collect numbers into the 21st century. For example, as of 2006, the California Highway Patrol still published Zenith 1-2000.

==== Special phrase ====
During local events an arrangement could be made to automatically charge calls as collect with the use of a special phrase. For example, during United States elections in the early 1970s, Bell System operators applied simplified procedures for collect calls placed by reporters at polling locations to regional tabulation centers operated by the News Election Service (NES). Reporters were instructed to place calls with the phrase "NES Election Collect to [number]", eliminating the normal requirement to obtain the calling party's name or verify whether the called number was a coin telephone. The called party accepted charges with the phrase "NES — OK collect", which operators recorded as acceptance without further announcement.

=== Third-number ===
A third number call or third party call was an operator-assisted telephone call that could be billed to a party other than the calling and called party. The operator called the third number for the party to accept the charges before the call could proceed.

In the Bell System, the operator contacted the third-number party with the phrase: "This is the long distance operator. (calling party) is calling from another telephone or (calling place) and wishes to bill the call to this number. Will that be satisfactory?" Two attempts were made to reach the third-number party; if acceptance could not be secured, the call was referred to a service assistant.

When a third-number call originated from a coin telephone, a modified procedure applied: the operator connected the call first and, at the earliest opportunity, cut out of the conversation to contact the third-number party for acceptance. If the third number refused the charge, the operator interrupted the in-progress conversation, split the connection, informed the calling party of the refusal, and requested a coin deposit for the elapsed time. The calling party was given the option of providing an alternative billing arrangement — such as a credit card or a different third number — before conversation could resume; if no satisfactory arrangement could be made, the call was terminated.

=== Credit card ===
A credit card call was billed to a telephone company issued credit card. The operator would verify the card number based on its format and by checking a printed fraud list, or key the card number into the console before completing the call. If a coin telephone were used, any deposited coins would be returned. Hotel guests could also charge long-distance calls to their room using a similar procedure.

By the early 1970s, fraudulent use of Bell System credit cards had increased substantially, and operators were considered the primary line of defense, with the fraud-detection department unable to intercept all misuse after the fact. Operators were instructed never to reveal in what way a presented number was unacceptable, and instead to suggest alternative billing arrangements such as collect or station-paid.

=== Coin Paid ===
Coin Paid referred to calls made from a coin-operated telephone where all charges were paid using deposited coins. Before completing the call, the operator either requested the required amount using standard phrases such as: "Deposit (amount) please, for the first (number) of minutes." or instructed the caller to "Have the money ready" to deposit on answer.

Depending on the system in use, operators would either manually count the deposited amount by listening to phone signals (bells, gongs, or beeps) generated by each deposited coin or monitor displayed amounts on systems such as TSPS. On more advanced pre-pay systems, operators could manually collect or return deposited coins. In rural or post-pay areas, however, coin control was not available, so operators had to request and tally payment after the called party (CLD) answered.

Five cents for the next three minutes
Pat Fleet reading an ACTS automated warning to deposit five cents to continue a coin paid call.

If the conversation continued beyond the initial paid period, overtime charges had to be collected. The operator would then interrupt the call to request more coins. If the calling party (CLG) left the line before overtime payment was collected, the operator would call the coin phone back and request payment. If the operator could not collect the full amount owed, they recorded the actual amount received.

When a customer deposited more money than required, the operator could either return the excess immediately, if coin control was available, or arrange for a refund to be mailed after the call ended.

== Information ==
=== Directory assistance ===
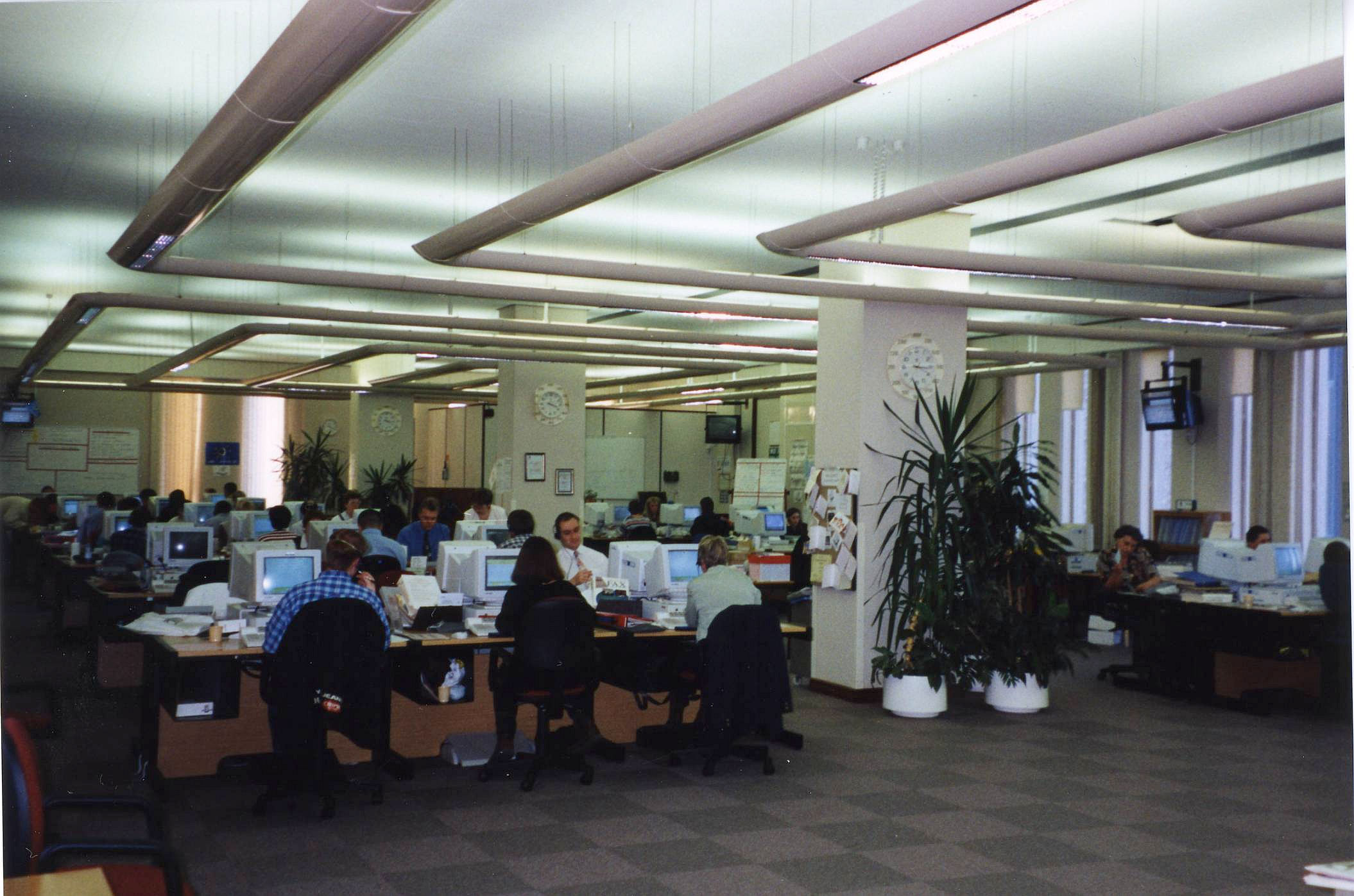
Staff at the BT Foreign Directory Enquiries Centre at the Grimsby Telephone Exchange in Grimsby (1996)

Directory assistance provided callers with telephone numbers and, in some cases, addresses for residential, business, and government subscribers. The caller gave the operator a name and location; the operator searched a physical directory or phonebook, and later a database terminal, and read back the number. Most systems allowed up to two listings per call.

Early operators worked from printed telephone directories. Later systems introduced database terminals, then automated number readback, allowing the operator to move to the next caller as soon as the listing was located. By the 1990s, interactive voice response systems using speech recognition could handle many calls without live operator intervention.

Directory assistance calls were historically included in land line service but per-call charges were introduced starting in the 1970s.

=== Intercept ===
The intercept operator handled calls that could not be completed because the dialed number had been disconnected, changed, or was otherwise not in service. When a call was diverted to intercept, the operator's standard opening was to ask the caller what number they had dialed, look up the status of that number in a reference list, and advise accordingly, providing a new number if one had been assigned, or confirming that the number was no longer in service.

The position was labor-intensive; operators at busy intercept bureaus were expected to handle multiple calls per minute and were monitored on call duration. Beginning in 1965, Bell Laboratories and Western Electric developed the Automatic Intercept System (AIS), which used stored-program controls and magnetic drum recordings to assemble and deliver customized announcements, including the dialed number and the reason for failure, without operator involvement for the majority of calls.

Early automated systems typically offered the caller the option to remain on the line for a live intercept operator after the announcement; this option was later removed as automation became more complete.

=== Rate and Route (R&R) ===
The rate and route operator was a specialized internal position consulted by telephone operators to resolve numbering and routing questions that could not be answered locally.

R&R operators could provide the area code and dialing pattern for a given city, the directory assistance routing for a given exchange, the inward operator routing for a given NPA-NXX combination, and the place name corresponding to a given office code.

International routings, including directory and inward operator access for foreign cities, were handled the same way. The position was reachable via a dedicated network route, for example the area code plus 141.

The R&R function was later supplemented by the automated Rate Quote System (RQS), a voice response system into which operators keyed routing queries and received synthesized voice responses, and was ultimately retired in 1987 when operator positions were equipped with the COMPIS computer terminal, which provided routing data directly on screen.

== Special ==
=== Air-to-ground ===
Operators connected calls between passengers or crew on aircraft in flight and the land telephone network via VHF radio links. The first recorded scheduled service of this kind operated on the Chicago–Seattle route by Northwest Airlines in 1937.

Calls were routed through ground stations and then connected to the public switched telephone network; as the aircraft moved, coverage passed between stations. Operators handled billing verification and call completion, with the constraint that connection windows were brief and ground station coverage changed continuously with the aircraft's position. Commercial passenger air-ground telephone service expanded significantly in the 1980s with the introduction of Airfone, which provided seatback handsets on major airlines.

=== Conference ===
An operator-assisted conference call was a call with multiple parties managed by a dedicated conference operator. The telephone operator would either call participants or answer an inbound conference number which participants called, and add them to the conference — and deal with any reconnection issues. The operator might optionally gather specific information from each participant, introduce key speakers, and manage questions and answers.

=== Marine ===
Operators connected calls between vessels at sea and the land telephone network, initially via HF radio links through coast stations and later via satellite. The introduction of the MARISAT system in 1976 — three geosynchronous satellites built by Hughes Aircraft for COMSAT Corporation and positioned over the Atlantic, Pacific, and Indian Oceans, provided the first dedicated maritime satellite communications capability, supporting voice, telex, facsimile, and data between ships and shore.

Shore-based operators at coast earth stations patched satellite links to the PSTN and coordinated with international gateway operators to complete the full circuit. In 1979 the International Maritime Satellite Organization (Inmarsat) was established by 28 countries to take over and expand the service; Inmarsat assumed operational control from the Marisat system in 1981.

=== Military ===
Operators served the Department of Defense's worldwide Automatic Voice Network (AUTOVON), a parallel telephone system built from 1963 to provide the military with communications independent of the civilian PSTN. The network linked approximately 1,700 military installations globally and incorporated a multilevel precedence and preemption system allowing higher-priority calls to displace lower-priority ones on congested circuits — a capability unavailable on the civilian network.

Operators assisted with calls requiring precedence handling, connections to non-dialable military points, and bridging between AUTOVON and the civilian network. AUTOVON was replaced by the Defense Switched Network in the early 1990s.

=== Overseas ===
International calls were handled by specialized operators co-located at dedicated International Switching Centers (ISCs), which served as gateways between the domestic network and foreign telephone systems. Before the introduction of automated international dialing, all such calls required operator assistance, much as domestic long-distance calls had before Direct Distance Dialing.

The Bell System ultimately operated seven ISCs in North America, located in White Plains, New York City, Pittsburgh, Jacksonville, Oakland, Denver, and Montreal, each serving as the primary gateway to particular overseas countries with overflow connections to secondary destinations.

International operators required knowledge of foreign country routing, applicable time zones, and currency conversion for rate calculation, and coordinated with foreign operators to provide language assistance when needed. AT&T began experimenting with International Direct Distance Dialing (IDDD) as early as 1967, offering select New York City customers the ability to dial Paris and London directly; the first official IDDD service launched in May 1970, initially limited to the United Kingdom.

=== Radiotelephone ===
Operators handled calls to and from vehicle-mounted mobile telephones under the original Mobile Telephone Service (MTS), which required operator involvement in both directions: inbound calls were routed to the mobile operator who located and signaled the vehicle, while outbound calls were placed through the operator who connected to the land network. The service was labor-intensive and capacity-limited, with channels shared across a wide geographic area.

The introduction of the Improved Mobile Telephone Service (IMTS) in 1964 largely replaced operator-assisted mobile calls with direct dial, though manual mobile service persisted in some areas considerably longer, California, for example, did not fully convert to IMTS until 1982.

=== Relay and TDD ===
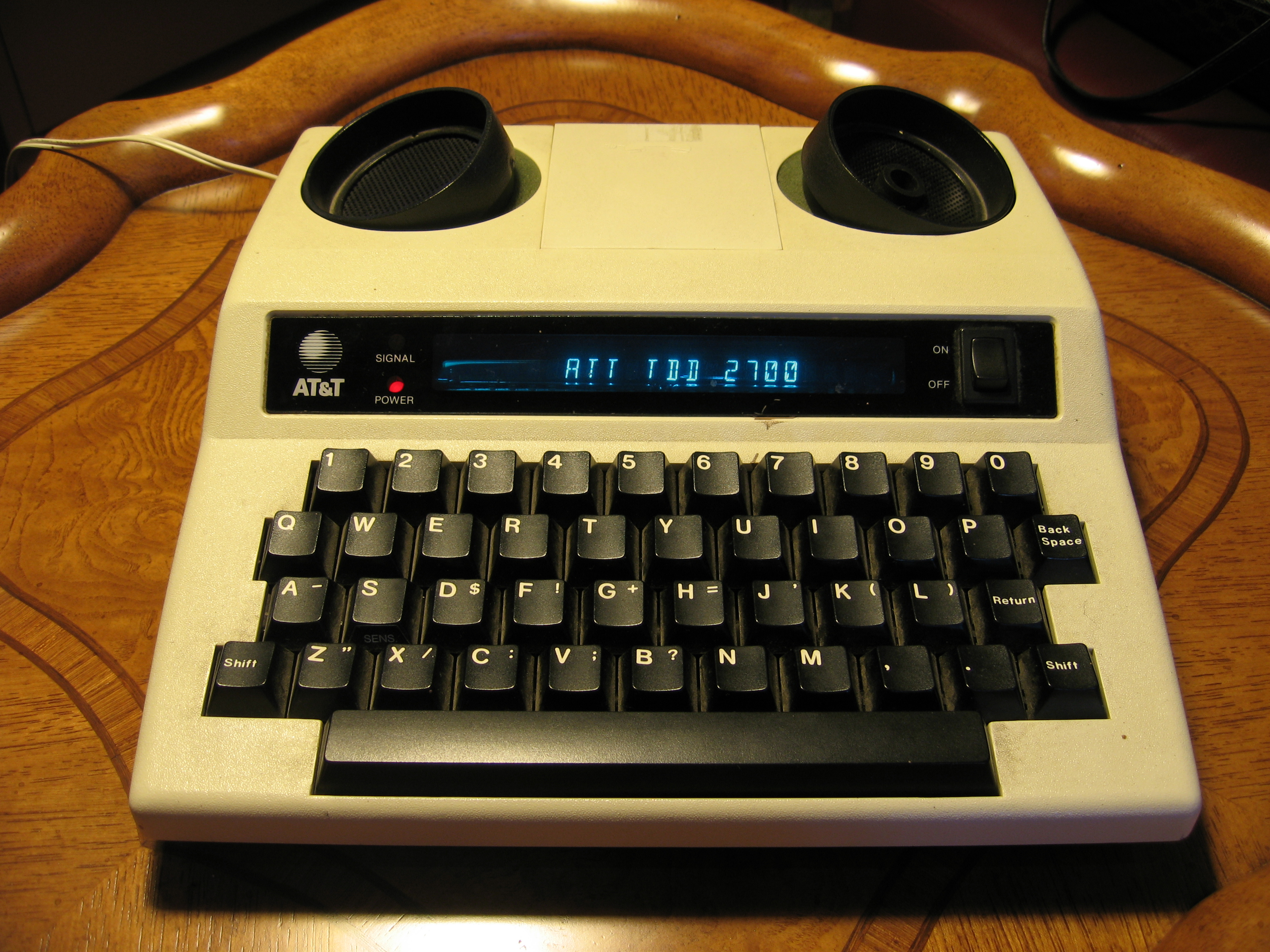
AT&T TDD 2700

Telephone relay services allowed deaf or speech-impaired callers to communicate with hearing parties through an operator acting as an intermediary.

The caller used a telecommunications device for the deaf (TDD), also known as a teletypewriter (TTY) or textphone, to type messages over the telephone line; the relay operator voiced the typed text to the hearing party and typed back their spoken responses in real time.

The TDD itself transmitted text via frequency-shift keying (FSK) at 45.5 baud using a variant of the Baudot code, allowing only half-duplex communication. Variant services included hearing carry-over (HCO), for callers who could hear but not speak, and voice carry-over (VCO), for those who could speak but not hear. As with other operator functions, relay services were progressively supplanted by direct text communication technologies including SMS, internet relay chat, and real-time text over IP.

=== Telex ===
Bell System's Teletypewriter Exchange Service (TWX), which commenced operation on November 21, 1931, had its own operator corps handling switched text connections for business customers over dedicated lines, in a manner directly analogous to voice operator services. TWX operators connected subscribers, assisted with routing, and handled billing for text-based business calls.

The service was integrated into the Direct Distance Dialing network in 1962, reducing but not eliminating operator involvement. Western Union purchased the TWX network from AT&T in January 1969, the only major competitor to its own Telex network, and completed the conversion to its Telex II system by 1981.

== Automation ==
Beginning in the 1960s, operator assistance functions were progressively automated through systems such as Direct Distance Dialing (DDD), the Traffic Service Position System (TSPS), and later Operator Services Position System (OSPS). These systems eliminated manual cord-switching while retaining operators for billing verification, collect-call handling, coin supervision, and specialized services.

== Decline ==
By the late twentieth century, customer-dialed long-distance service, toll-free numbers, calling cards, cellular telephony, and automated billing systems had eliminated most routine operator functions. Many telephone companies subsequently discontinued person-to-person, collect, and third-number billing services entirely.

Most traditional regulated landline providers still offer operator and directory assistance, including free or discounted services for customers with disabilities. In 2024, AT&T customers placed more than 55,000 operator-assisted calls.

=== List of active operator assistance numbers ===
- Australia: 1234
- Canada: 0
- Hong Kong: 10010 (national), 10013 (international)
- United Kingdom: 100 (national), 155 (international)
- United States: 0 (local), 00 (long distance and international) - although no longer supported by some telephone companies or service types

=== List of historical and withdrawn operator assistance numbers ===
- Ireland: 10 (national), 114 (international). Service withdrawn in 2007.
- North America (North American Numbering Plan):
  - 0 (followed by a delay to distinguish from 0+ dialing, below, or, later, terminated with #): domestic operator
  - 00 (followed by a delay to distinguish from 0+ dialing, below, or, later, terminated with #): international operator (USA only)
  - 0 + seven or ten digits: national non-local—promoted as Zero Plus Dialing, with some exchanges allowing additional digits dialed to identify billing preference and enter a billing card number
  - 01 + country code + number: international version of Zero Plus, also the operator-assisted version of 011 + country code + number

== See also ==
- Long-distance operator
- Traffic Service Position System
