= Pat Fleet =

American voice actress

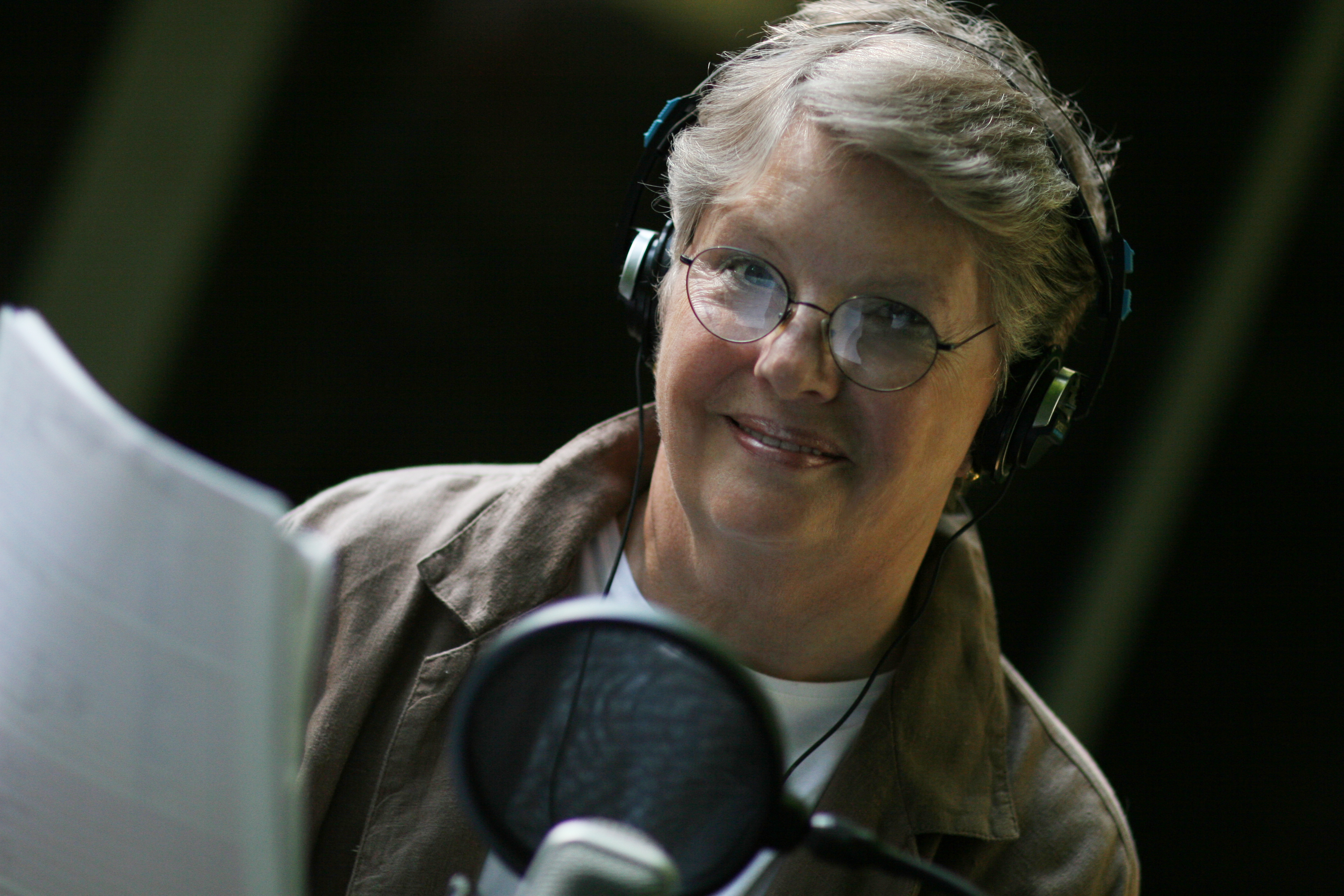
- Fleet in studio, 2008
- Born: Patricia Curry; September 11, 1943 (age 82); Dayton, Ohio, U.S.
- Occupation: Voice actress
- Years active: 1981–present
- Spouse(s): William Fleet (1935–2016)
- Website: patfleet.com

Pat Trumble Fleet is an American voice actress. Widely recognized for the tens of thousands of recordings she has made for US telephone companies such as AT&T, Verizon, Qwest, the former Bell System companies, and others since 1981, she is still most recognized as the person who says "AT&T" in the company's sound trademark, which played prior to any operator assisted or credit card paid call, and on answer when calling AT&T customer service numbers.

She is also the voice for most "star" services (e.g. last-call return, call blocking, etc.) for AT&T local telephone companies, and the voice heard when making AT&T handled calls through 1-800-CALL-ATT (225-5288) and through international AT&T access numbers such as USADirect.

== History ==
Fleet in studio c. 1982

In 1981, working alongside Jane Barbe, she began recording messages for the Audichron Company (now known as ETC) announcing time, temperature and weather, and was the voice of the Bell System's Automated Coin Toll System, quoting rates and collecting charges for coin-paid calls.

In addition, she continues to be the voice for a significant number of telephone company intercept recordings – messages giving reasons for call failure that start with a special information tone and usually begin with the phrase "We're sorry...".

Through the years, her voice became well known through the phone companies' use of her recordings, and through several AT&T internal customer studies it was determined that customers preferred her voice over any other. As a result, she was selected to become the company's signature sound for the AT&T trademark in 1989.

In Back to the Future Part II the automated AT&T message heard at the end of future Marty McFly’s video call was voiced by Pat Fleet, though she is uncredited.

Five cents for the next three minutes
Pat Fleet reading an ACTS automated warning to deposit five cents to continue a coin paid call.

Example of Last-call return from Verizon Home Phone Service
Last-call return (with a fake NANP number, 987-654-3210). Voice is Pat Fleet.

Example of intercept message voiced by Pat Fleet

== See also ==
- Susan Bennett

Preceded by Jane Barbe	Voice of AT&T; 1 January 1984 – present	Incumbent
