= Jane Barbe =

American voice actress and singer

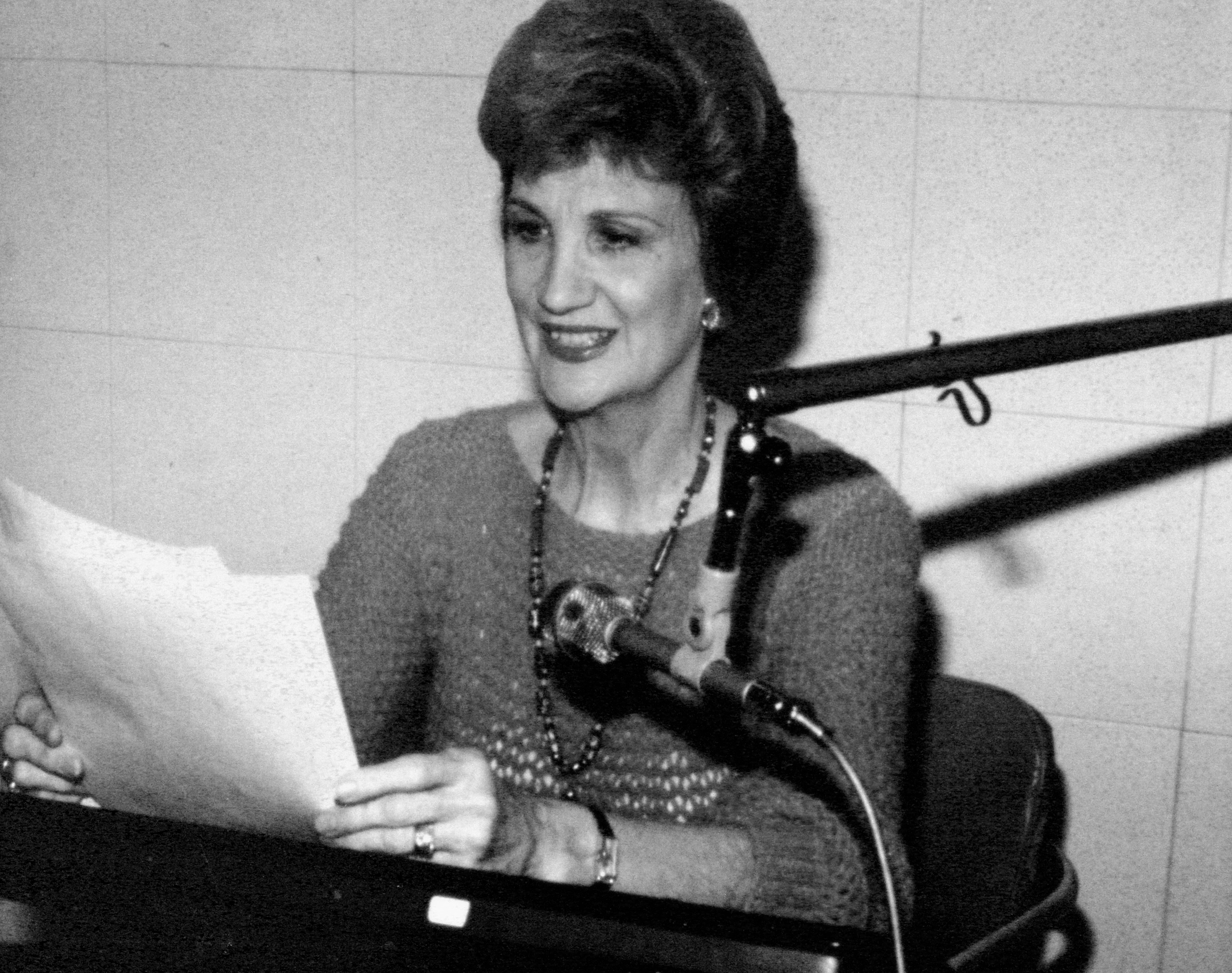
- Born: Millicent Jane Schneider; July 29, 1928; Winter Haven, Florida, U.S.
- Died: July 18, 2003 (aged 74); Roswell, Georgia, U.S.
- Occupations: Voice actress, singer
- Years active: 1963–2003
- Spouse: John Barbe

Jane Barbe (/ˈbɑːrbi/ BAR-bee; July 29, 1928 – July 18, 2003) was an American voice actress and singer. She was known as the "Time Lady" for the recordings she made for the Bell System and other phone companies. The ubiquity of her recordings eventually made her a pop culture figure, and her death drew national attention.

== Career ==
Barbe was born Millicent Jane Schneider in Winter Haven, Florida, and raised in Atlanta, Georgia. She studied drama at the University of Georgia.

After graduating, Barbe worked as a copywriter, though due to her poor spelling, she opted to read her first commercial out loud to her boss instead of submitting it in writing. He asked her to record the commercial herself. In 1963, she began recording messages for the Audichron Company, announcing time, temperature and weather, as well as recordings for early voicemail systems. In the 1970s and 1980s, she regularly recorded the intercept messages used when a number is disconnected or misdialed, and started sharing recording duties with AT&T voice Pat Fleet in 1981, who eventually took over Barbe's role.

Barbe was selected to be the first voice on the Octel Communications voicemail systems and retained that role for many years. Her voice was used on all the prompts (which numbered in the thousands). People often referred to the voice on Octel systems as "Jane", and Barbe and her husband John were named honorary life employees of Octel in 1992. Over 150 million people used Octel systems prior to the company being acquired in 1997 by Lucent. By 2000, Barbe's voice was heard by about 300 million people each week. Through the years, Barbe's voice became well known through the phone companies' use of her recordings, as well as her messages recorded for customized greetings for various corporations who bought Octel voicemail systems. The time announcements she recorded for NBS (now NIST) are still used on radio station WWVH. Her voice was also heard on hotel wake-up calls and commercial elevator messages.

Recordings with her voice are also used in Hong Kong, Saudi Arabia, and other countries. Although her native dialect was Southern, she learned to adopt her trademark "General American" speech while studying drama. When asked to record 1,500 time and temperature messages for Telecom Australia, she perfected an Australian accent by listening to recordings of Australian speakers.

== Other work ==
Barbe was also a former professional singer, meeting her husband while touring with the Buddy Morrow Orchestra, and gained a bit of notoriety in later years, appearing in commercials and on television shows based on her recognition as the "Time Lady". As a result of her extensive work, she was an early member and a board member of the Atlanta branch of the American Federation of Television and Radio Artists.

Barbe and her husband created several hundred singing commercials (jingles). She performed on many of them. She also did voice-over work on TV and films, including the voice of Southern author Margaret Mitchell in the 1988 documentary The Making of a Legend: Gone With the Wind.

On September 26, 2015, both she and her husband were inducted into the Georgia Music Hall of Fame.

== Death ==
Barbe died from cancer in Roswell, Georgia, on July 18, 2003. She was 74 years old, 11 days short of her 75th birthday. She was survived by her husband John Barbe, her daughter Susan Stubin, her son David Barbe, and seven grandchildren.

Preceded by Mary Moore	Voice of AT&T; 1 January 1963 – 1 January 1984	Succeeded by Pat Fleet
