= Overlooked (obituary feature) =

New York Times recurring series

Overlooked No More is a recurring feature in the obituary section of The New York Times, which honors "remarkable people" whose deaths had been overlooked by editors of that section since its creation in 1851. The feature was introduced on March 8, 2018, for International Women's Day, when the Times published fifteen obituaries of such "overlooked" women, and has since become a regular feature in the paper.

The project was created by Amy Padnani, the digital editor of the obituaries desk, and Jessica Bennett, the paper's gender editor. In its introduction, it was admitted that the paper's obituaries had been "dominated by white men", and that the project was intended to help "address these inequities of our time".

In May 2018, it was reported that the Times had partnered with Anonymous Content and Paramount Television to develop a drama anthology franchise based on the feature, with each season chronicling a notable woman.

== List of honorees ==
=== International Women's Day (March 8, 2018) ===
1. Ida B. Wells, (1862–1931), "took on racism in the deep south with powerful reporting on lynchings"
2. Qiu Jin, (1875–1907), "beheaded by imperial forces, was 'China's Joan of Arc'"
3. Mary Ewing Outerbridge, (1852–1886), "helped bring tennis to the United States"
4. Diane Arbus, (1923–1971), "a photographer, whose portraits have compelled or repelled generations of viewers"
5. Marsha P. Johnson, (1945–2002), "a transgender pioneer and activist"
6. Sylvia Plath, (1932–1963), "a postwar poet unafraid to confront her despair"
7. Henrietta Lacks, (1920–1951), "whose cells lead to a medical revolution"
8. Madhubala, (1933–1969), "a Bollywood legend whose tragic life mirrored Marilyn Monroe's"
9. Emily Warren Roebling, (1843–1903), "the woman behind the man who built the Brooklyn Bridge"
10. Nella Larsen, (1891–1964), "wrestled with race and sexuality in the Harlem renaissance"
11. Ada Lovelace, (1815–1852), "mathematician who wrote the first computer program"
12. Margaret Abbott, (1878–1955), "an unwitting olympic trailblazer"
13. Belkis Ayón, (1967–1999), "a Cuban printmaker inspired by a secret male society"
14. Charlotte Brontë, (1816–1855), "Novelist known for Jane Eyre"
15. Lillias Campbell Davidson, (1853–1934), "an early advocate for women's cycling"

=== Black History Month (February 2019) ===
During February 2019, in honor of Black History Month, the paper published obituaries for "a prominent group of black men and women" who were not examined at the time of their deaths. Padnani wrote that readers' suggestions of whom to write about "have yielded some of the most-read obituaries".

1. Gladys Bentley, (1907–1960), "a gender bending blues performer who became 1920s Harlem royalty".
2. Scott Joplin, (1867–1917), "a pianist and ragtime master who wrote 'The Entertainer' and the groundbreaking opera 'Treemonisha'.
3. Margaret Garner, (1833–1858), "who killed her own daughter rather than return her to the horrors of slavery".
4. Major Taylor, (1878–1932), "a world champion bicycle racer whose fame was undermined by prejudice".
5. Zelda Wynn Valdes, (1905–2001), "a fashion designer who outfitted the glittery stars of screen and stage".
6. Alfred Hair, (1941–1970), "a charismatic businessman who created a movement for Florida's black artists".
7. Nina Mae McKinney, (1912–1957), "an actress who defied the barrier of race to find stardom in Europe".
8. Granville Woods, (1856–1910), "an inventor known as the 'Black Edison'".
9. Oscar Micheaux, (1884–1951), "a pioneering filmmaker prefiguring independent directors like Spike Lee and Tyler Perry".
10. Mary Ellen Pleasant, (1814–1907), "born into slavery, she became a Gold Rush-era millionaire and a powerful abolitionist".
11. Elizabeth Jennings Graham, (1827–1901), "Life experiences primed her to fight for racial equality. Her moment came on a streetcar ride to church."
12. Philip A. Payton Jr., (1876–1917), "a real estate magnate who turned Harlem into a black mecca".
13. Moses Fleetwood Walker, (1857–1924), "the first black baseball player in the big leagues, even before Jackie Robinson".

=== Other honorees ===
- Sinclair Clark, "[He] made museum masterpieces. Why was his name left out?", published November 6, 2026
- Harry Lew, "the basketball player who refused to be sidelined", published October 16, 2026
- Eugenia Errázuriz, "who opened doors for Picasso", published October 3, 2026
- Hilda Terry, "who cracked the code of teen culture", published September 18, 2026
- Patricia Douglas, "who challenged Hollywood's culture of abuse", published August 21, 2026
- Barbara Rubin, "teenage filmmaker at the heart of New York's underground", published July 24, 2026
- Garrincha, "Brazil's brilliant and broken World Cup hero", published July 10, 2026
- Robbie Basho, "guitar mystic who sought enlightenment in sound", published June 19, 2026
- Nancy Sheung, "whose camera captured women on their own terms", published May 29, 2026
- Jackie Pung, "pioneering golfer whose setback became her story", published May 13, 2026
- Margaret Moth, "fearless CNN camera operator", published April 11, 2026
- Gertrude Chandler Warner, "author of 'The Boxcar Children'", published March 27, 2026
- Eleanor Abbott, "the creator of Candy Land", published March 13, 2026
- Bobby Garnett, "'godfather' of vintage dealers", published February 27, 2026
- Clifford Brown, "trumpeter whose brief life left a lasting mark", published February 12, 2026
- Jimmy Reed, "the bluesman everyone covered, then forgot", published January 31, 2026
- Pamela Colman Smith, "artist behind a famous tarot deck", published January 2, 2026
- Inge Lehmann, "who discovered the Earth's inner core", published December 20, 2025
- Dorothy Wise, "the 'grandmother of pool' who defied the odds", published December 4, 2025
- Sabina Spielrein, "visionary lost between Freud and Jung", published November 14, 2025
- Hannah Szenes, "poet and paratrooper who defied the Nazis", published October 31, 2025
- Violeta Parra, "folk 'genius' who redefined Latin American music", published October 10, 2025
- Bessie Margolin, "lawyer who turned workers' hopes into law", published October 2, 2025
- Eglantyne Jebb, "who started a movement with Save the Children", published September 12, 2025
- Tina Modotti, "whose life was striking in photographs", published August 30, 2025
- Molly Drake, "a maternal musical force behind Nick Drake's sound", published August 13, 2025
- Polina Gelman, "fearless 'Night Witch' who haunted Nazi troops", published July 19, 2025
- Rotimi Fani-Kayode, "whose camera sought a truer image of black men", published June 27, 2025
- Hong Yen Chang, "lawyer who challenged a racial system", published June 6, 2025
- Walasse Ting, "who bridged cultures with paint and prose", published May 16, 2025
- Joyce Brown, "whose struggle redefined the rights of the homeless", published May 1, 2025
- Ethel Lina White, "master of suspense who inspired Hitchcock", published April 17, 2025
- Katharine McCormick, "force behind the birth control pill", published April 3, 2025
- Beulah Louise Henry, "inventor with an endless imagination", published March 14, 2025
- Maria W. Stewart, "trailblazing voice for Black women", published March 1, 2025
- Lena Richard, "who brought Creole cooking to the masses", published February 14, 2025
- Annie Easley, "who helped take spaceflight to new heights", published February 1, 2025
- Karen Wynn Fonstad, "who mapped Tolkien's Middle-earth", published January 13, 2025
- Fidelia Bridges, "artist who captured the natural world", published December 12, 2024
- Margaret Getchell, "visionary force at Macy's", published November 27, 2024
- Gowongo Mohawk, "trailblazing Indigenous actress", published November 9, 2024
- Margaret E. Knight, "innovator of the flat-bottomed paper bag", published October 25, 2024
- Mariama Bâ, "voice of African feminism", published October 11, 2024
- Ellen E. Armstrong, "'marvelous, mystifying' magician of mirth", published September 20, 2024
- Gwendolyn B. Bennett, "Harlem renaissance star plagued by misfortune", published September 6, 2024
- Mabel Addis, "who pioneered storytelling in video games", published August 24, 2024
- Renee Carroll, "world's most famous hatcheck girl", published August 9, 2024
- Willy De Bruyn, "cycling champion who broke gender boundaries", published July 25, 2024
- Ursula Parrott, "best-selling author and voice for the modern woman", published July 10, 2024
- Otto Lucas, "God in the hat world", published June 28, 2024
- Lorenza Böttner, "transgender artist who found beauty in disability", published June 15, 2024
- Hansa Jivraj Mehta, "who fought for women's equality in India and beyond", published May 31, 2024
- Bill Hosokawa, "journalist who chronicled Japanese American history", published May 16, 2024
- Min Matheson, "labor leader who faced down mobsters", published May 3, 2024
- Lizzie Magie, "the unknown inventor behind Monopoly", published April 12, 2024
- Henrietta Swan Leavitt, "who unraveled mysteries of the stars", published March 27, 2024
- Yvonne Barr, "who helped discover a cancer-causing virus", published March 21, 2024
- Miriam Solovieff, "lauded violinist who suffered tragedy", published March 15, 2024
- Betty Fiechter, "pioneer in the world of watches", published March 1, 2024
- Pierre Toussaint, "philanthropist and candidate for sainthood", published February 18, 2024
- Henry Heard, "tap dancer and advocate for people with disabilities", published February 2, 2024
- Beatrix Potter, "author of The Tale of Peter Rabbit", published January 19, 2024
- Cordell Jackson, "elder stateswoman of rock 'n' roll", published January 6, 2024
- Ethel J. Lindgren-Utsi, "anthropologist of reindeer herding cultures", published December 22, 2023
- Ada Blackjack, "survivor of a harrowing expedition", published December 9, 2023
- Elena Zelayeta, "emissary for Mexican cooking", published November 22, 2023
- Ángela Ruiz Robles, "inventor of an early e-reader", published November 10, 2023
- Adefunmi, "who introduced African Americans to Yoruba", published October 27, 2023
- Omero C. Catan, "who gained fame as 'Mr. First'", published October 12, 2023
- Alice Elizabeth Anderson, "who ran Australia's first all-woman garage", published September 26, 2023
- Margaret Chung, "doctor who was 'different from others'", published September 18, 2023
- Molly Spotted Elk, "steward of Penobscot culture", published September 14, 2023
- Chick Strand, "pioneering experimental filmmaker", published August 31, 2023
- Lily Parr, "dominant British soccer player", published July 21, 2023
- Hannie Schaft, "resistance fighter during World War II", published July 7, 2023
- Dolores Alexander, "feminist journalist and activist", published June 25, 2023
- Lou Sullivan, "author and transgender activist", published June 9, 2023
- Sultan Khan, "untrained chess player who became a champion", published May 27, 2023
- James Sakoda, "whose wartime internment inspired a social science tool", published May 8, 2023
- Elizabeth Wagner Reed, "who resurrected legacies of women in science", published April 22, 2023
- Alice Ball, "chemist who created a treatment for leprosy", published April 8, 2023
- Lilian Lindsay, "Britain's first female dentist", published March 21, 2023
- Dilys Winn, "who brought murder and mystery to Manhattan", published March 10, 2023
- Clara Driscoll, "designer of vision in glass for Tiffany", published February 23, 2023
- Frances Ellen Watkins Harper, "poet and suffragist", published February 7, 2023
- Mary Barr, "who fought wildfires from aloft", published January 28, 2023
- Tove Ditlevsen, "Danish writer of confessional autofiction", published January 7, 2023
- Audrey Munson, "forgotten but, living on in sculptures, not gone", published December 15, 2022
- Ann Davison, "who crossed the Atlantic alone", published December 3, 2022
- Cléoma Falcon, "Queen of Cajun music", published November 11, 2022
- Dorothy Spencer, "film editor sought out by big directors", published October 29, 2022
- Katharine Cook Briggs and Isabel Briggs Myers, "creators of a personality test", published October 14, 2022
- María Orosa, "inventor of banana ketchup", published September 29, 2022
- Sylvia Rexach, "Puerto Rican singer and composer", published September 16, 2022
- Vera Menchik, "first women's chess champion", published September 2, 2022
- Regina Jonas, "on whose shoulders 'all female rabbis stand'", published August 19, 2022
- Alda Merini, "poet who wrote of life's joys and struggles", published August 5, 2022
- Lottie Brunn, "the 'Queen of jugglers'", published July 21, 2022
- Klaus Nomi, "singer with an otherworldly persona", published June 30, 2022
- William B. Gould, "escaped slave and Civil War diarist", published June 17, 2022
- Maureen Colquhoun, "pathbreaking politician waylaid by bias", published June 3, 2022
- Junichi Arai, "innovative textile designer", published May 13, 2022
- Ady Fidelin, "Black model 'hidden in plain sight'", published April 29, 2022
- Jacqueline Kahanoff, "writer of Levantine identity", published April 16, 2022
- Elizabeth Hayes, "coal town doctor who fought for miners", published April 1, 2022
- Louise Little, "activist and mother of Malcolm X", published March 19, 2022
- Barbara Shermund, "flapper-era cartoonist", published March 4, 2022
- Mary Eliza Mahoney, "who opened doors in nursing", published February 19, 2022
- Ora Washington, "star of tennis and baseball", published February 4, 2022
- Lee Godie, "eccentric Chicago street artist", published January 21, 2022
- Theresa Hak Kyung Cha, "artist and author who explored identity", published January 7, 2022
- Frances Benjamin Johnston, "photographer who defied genteel norms", published December 15, 2021
- Julia Tuttle, "the 'mother of Miami'", published December 3, 2021
- Ruth Polsky, "who shaped New York's music scene", published November 18, 2021
- Louise Blanchard Bethune, "who changed the face of Buffalo", published November 4, 2021
- Kim Hak-sun, "who broke the silence for 'comfort women'", published October 21, 2021
- Violet Piercy, "pioneering marathoner", published October 8, 2021
- Remedios Varo, "Spanish painter of magic, mysticism and science", published September 24, 2021
- Sinn Sisamouth, "'King' of Cambodian pop music", published September 9, 2021
- Randy Snow, "Paralympic champion of wheelchair tennis", published August 27, 2021
- Hettie Anderson, "sculptors' model who evaded fame", published August 12, 2021
- Rebecca Lee Crumpler, "who battled prejudice in medicine", published July 16, 2021
- Eva Kotchever, "writer who gave lesbians a voice", published July 2, 2021
- Jobriath, "openly gay glam rocker in the '70s", published June 11, 2021
- Si-Lan Chen, "whose dances encompassed worlds", published May 27, 2021
- Usha Mehta, "freedom fighter against British rule in India", published May 13, 2021
- Inji Aflatoun, "Egyptian artist of the people", published April 29, 2021
- Bhanu Athaiya, "who won India its first Oscar", published April 22, 2021
- Granville Redmond, "painter, actor, friend", published April 8, 2021
- Kitty Cone, "trailblazer of the disability rights movement", published March 26, 2021
- Aminah Robinson, "whose art chronicled Black life", published February 26, 2021
- Jimmie McDaniel, "tennis player who broke barriers", published February 11, 2021
- Jay Jaxon, "pioneering designer of French couture", published January 28, 2021
- Clarice Lispector, "novelist who captivated Brazil", published December 18, 2020
- Barbara Waxman Fiduccia, "reproductive rights advocate", published December 4, 2020
- Anya Phillips, "fashion influencer in New York's punk scene", published November 12, 2020
- Rosa May Billinghurst, "militant suffragette", published October 30, 2020
- Eleanor Flexner, "pioneering feminist in an anti-feminist age", published October 16, 2020
- Lucy Diggs Slowe, "scholar who persisted against racism and sexism", published October 1, 2020
- Mabel Ping-Hua Lee, "suffragist with a distinction", published September 19, 2020
- Charlotta Bass, "[who came] before Kamala Harris", published September 4, 2020
- Leonora O'Reilly, "who fought for working women", published August 21, 2020
- Jovita Idar, "who promoted rights of Mexican-Americans and women", published August 7, 2020
- Roland Johnson, "who fought to shut down institutions for the disabled", published July 31, 2020
- Cheryl Marie Wade, "a performer who refused to hide", published July 23, 2020
- Nancy Green, "the 'real Aunt Jemima'", published July 17, 2020
- Brad Lomax, "a bridge between civil rights movements", published July 8, 2020
- Karl Heinrich Ulrichs, "pioneering gay activist", published July 1, 2020
- Valerie Solanas, "radical feminist who shot Andy Warhol", published June 26, 2020
- Roberta Cowell, "trans trailblazer, pilot and auto racer", published June 5, 2020
- Hazel Ying Lee and Maggie Gee, "[who] soared the skies", published May 21, 2020
- June Almeida, "scientist who discovered the first coronavirus", published May 8, 2020
- Eunice Newton Foote, "climate scientist lost to history", published April 21, 2020
- F. N. Souza, "India's anti-establishment artist", published April 9, 2020
- Kate Worley, "a pioneer writer of erotic comics", published March 27, 2020
- Raka Rasmi, "Balinese dancer", published March 13, 2020
- Audrey Sutherland, "paddler of her own canoe", published March 6, 2020
- Valaida Snow, "charismatic 'Queen of the trumpet'", published February 22, 2020
- Andrée Blouin, "voice for independence in Africa", published February 14, 2020
- Joseph Bartholomew, "golf course architect", published February 5, 2020
- Homer Plessy, "who sat on a train and stood up for civil rights", published January 31, 2020
- Judee Sill, "singer whose life was cut short", published January 23, 2020
- Ana Orantes, "whose gruesome murder brought changes to Spain", published January 15, 2020
- Margaret McFarland, "mentor to Mr. Rogers", published January 8, 2020
- Earl Tucker, "a dancer known as 'Snakehips'", published December 18, 2019
- Bessie Coleman, "pioneering African-American aviatrix", published December 11, 2019
- Rose Mackenberg, "Houdini's secret 'ghost-buster'", published December 6, 2019
- Lillian Harris Dean, "culinary entrepreneur known as 'Pig Foot Mary'", published November 27, 2019
- Pauline Boty, "rebellious Pop artist", published November 20, 2019
- Annie Londonderry, "who traveled the world by bicycle", published November 11, 2019
- Olive Morris, "[who] fought for Black women's rights in Britain," published October 30, 2019
- Sanmao, "'wandering writer' who found her voice in the desert", published October 23, 2019
- Lotte Reiniger, "animator who created magic with scissors and paper", published October 16, 2019
- Mitsuye Endo, "a name linked to justice for Japanese-Americans", published October 9, 2019
- Robert Johnson, "bluesman whose life was a riddle", published September 25, 2019
- Elizabeth A. Gloucester, "'richest' black woman and ally of John Brown", published September 18, 2019
- Mihri Müşfik Hanım, "feminist artist in the Ottoman Empire", published September 12, 2019
- Alice Guy-Blaché, "the world's first female filmmaker", published September 6, 2019
- Elizabeth Rona, "pioneering scientist amid dangers of war", published August 28, 2019
- Lau Sing Kee, "war hero jailed for helping immigrants", published August 21, 2019
- Rani of Jhansi, "India's warrior queen who fought the British", published August 14, 2019
- William Byron Rumford, "a civil rights champion in California", published August 7, 2019
- Georgia Gilmore, "who fed and funded the Montgomery bus boycott", published July 31, 2019
- Gertrude Benham, "who climbed the world one mountain at a time", published July 24, 2019
- Florence Merriam Bailey, "who defined modern bird-watching", published July 17, 2019
- Else Ury, "[whose] stories survived World War II. She did not", published July 10, 2019
- Ralph Lazo, "who voluntarily lived in an internment camp", published July 3, 2019
- Bill Larson, "who became a symbol of gay loss in New Orleans", published June 26, 2019
- Claude Cahun, "whose photographs explored gender and sexuality", published June 19, 2019
- Ma Rainey, "the 'Mother of the Blues'", published June 12, 2019
- Alan Turing, "condemned code breaker and computer visionary", published June 5, 2019
- Emma Stebbins, "who sculpted an angel of New York", published May 29, 2019
- Debra Hill, "producer who parlayed Halloween into a cult classic", published May 22, 2019
- Grace Banker, "whose 'Hello Girls' decoded calls in World War I", published May 15, 2019
- Barbara Rose Johns, "who defied segregation in schools", published May 8, 2019
- Annie Edson Taylor, "who tumbled down Niagara Falls into fame", published May 1, 2019
- Martin Sostre, "who reformed America's prisons from his cell", published April 24, 2019
- Aloha Wanderwell, "explorer and filmmaker," published April 17, 2019
- Rose Morgan, "a pioneer in hairdressing and Harlem", published April 10, 2019
- S. N. Goenka, "who brought mindfulness to the West", published April 3, 2019
- Bessie Blount Griffin, "nurse, wartime inventor and handwriting expert", published March 27, 2019
- Elizabeth Peratrovich, "rights advocate for Alaska Natives", published March 20, 2019
- Isabella Goodwin, "New York City's first female police detective", published March 13, 2019
- Julia Morgan, "pioneering female architect", published March 6, 2019
- Dondi, "[and his] underground graffiti adventures", published February 27, 2019
- Dorothy Lee Bolden, "who started a movement for domestic workers", published February 20, 2019
- Dudley Randall, "whose broadside press gave a voice to black poets," published February 13, 2019
- Mabel Grammer, "whose brown baby plan found homes for hundreds", published February 6, 2019
- Forugh Farrokhzad, "Iranian poet, who broke barriers of sex and society", published January 30, 2019
- Mabel Stark, "fearless tiger trainer", published January 23, 2019
- Isabelle M. Kelley, "who developed a food stamp program to feed millions", published January 16, 2019
- Laura de Force Gordon, "suffragist, journalist and lawyer", published January 9, 2019
- Karen Spärck Jones, "who established the basis for search engines", published January 2, 2019
- Gertrude Beasley, "who wrote an uncompromising memoir, then vanished", published December 19, 2018
- Elizabeth Keckley, "dressmaker and confidante to Mary Todd Lincoln", published December 12, 2018
- Charley Parkhurst, "gold rush legend with a hidden identity", published December 5, 2018
- Noor Inayat Khan, "Indian princess and British spy", published November 28, 2018
- Lilian Jeannette Rice, "architect who lifted a style in California", published November 21, 2018
- Pandita Ramabai, "Indian scholar, feminist and educator", published November 14, 2018
- Jackie Mitchell, "who fanned two of the baseball's greats", published November 7, 2018
- Miki Gorman, "the unlikely marathon winner", published October 31, 2018
- Rose Zar, "a Holocaust survivor who hid in plain sight", published October 24, 2018
- Kin Yamei, "the Chinese doctor who introduced tofu to the West", published October 17, 2018
- Annemarie Schwarzenbach, "author, photographer, and 'ravaged angel'", published October 10, 2018
- Minnie Mae Freeman Penney, "Nebraska's 'fearless maid'", published October 3, 2018
- Voltairine de Cleyre, "America's 'greatest woman anarchist'", published September 26, 2018
- Ana Mendieta, "a Cuban artist who pushed boundaries", published September 19, 2018
- Marthe Cnockaert, "nurse who spied for the British in World War I", published September 12, 2018
- Melitta Bentz, "who invented the coffee filter", published September 5, 2018
- Ruby Payne-Scott, "who explored space with radio waves", published August 29, 2018
- Doria Shafik, "who led Egypt's women liberation movement", published August 22, 2018
- Sissieretta Jones, "a soprano that shattered racial barriers", published August 15, 2018
- Julia Sand, "whose letters inspired a president", published August 8, 2018
- Clara Lemlich, "crusading leader of labor rights", published August 1, 2018
- Edmonia Lewis, "sculptor of worldwide acclaim", published July 25, 2018
- Beatrice Tinsley, "astronomer who saw the course of the universe", published July 18, 2018
- Bette Nesmith Graham, "who invented liquid paper", published July 11, 2018
- Emma Gatewood, "first woman to conquer the Appalachian trail alone", published June 27, 2018
- Amrita Sher-Gil, "a pioneer of Indian art", published June 21, 2018
- Fannie Farmer, "modern cookery's pioneer", published June 14, 2018
- Mary Ann Shadd, "[who] shook up the abolitionist movement", published June 7, 2018
- Sophia Perovskaya, "the Russian icon who was hanged for killing a czar", published May 31, 2018
- Esther Hobart Morris, "she followed a trail to Wyoming. Then she blazed one.", published May 24, 2018
- Margarita Xirgu, "theater radical who staged Lorca's plays", published May 17, 2018
- Leticia Ramos-Shahani, "a Philippine women's rights pioneer", published May 10, 2018
- Julia de Burgos, "a poet who helped shape Puerto Rico's identity", published May 3, 2018
- Maria Bochkareva, "who led women into battle in WWI", published April 26, 2018
- Harriot Daley, "the Capitol's first telephone operator", published April 17, 2018
- Lin Huiyin and Liang Sicheng, "chroniclers of Chinese architecture", published April 11, 2018
- Bessie Stringfield, "the motorcycle queen of Miami", published April 4, 2018
- Yu Gwan-sun, "a Korean independence activist who defied Japanese rule", published March 29, 2018
- Ruth Graves Wakefield, "who invented the chocolate chip cookie", published March 22, 2018
- Alison Hargreaves, "who conquered Everest solo and without bottled oxygen", published March 15, 2018

== Series ==
In April 2019, Netflix and Higher Ground Productions (the production company founded by Barack Obama and Michelle Obama) announced that they would be adapting Overlooked into a scripted anthology series. The series would be produced by Liza Chasin of 3dot Productions and Joy Gorman Wettels of Anonymous Content.

== Musical ==
In May 2019, The Waa-Mu Show at Northwestern University presented a new, student-written musical based on Amisha Padnani and the Overlooked series, entitled For the Record.
