= Amy Padnani =

American journalist

- Occupation: Journalist, editor
- Website: www.amypadnani.com

Amisha "Amy" Padnani is an American journalist who is an editor on the obituaries desk at The New York Times. She is the creator of the Times series Overlooked, which features obituaries that tell the stories of individuals whose deaths were not originally reported by the Times, typically remarkable women and people of color.

Padnani is also the author, with writers of the Times, of Overlooked: A Celebration of Remarkable, Underappreciated People Who Broke the Rules and Changed the World, a collection of these obituaries, published in 2023 by Ten Speed Press.

== Career ==
Padnani wrote for metropolitan newspapers like Newsday, The Star-Ledger and The Staten Island Advance before moving to The New York Times in 2011. She became digital editor of obituaries at The New York Times in 2017. As the Obituaries editor of the Times, she researches, assigns and edits obituaries to in-house writers.

In 2020, Padnani contributed to a children's book, Finish the Fight! The Brave and Revolutionary Women Who Fought for the Right to Vote. The book received a 2021 Jane Addams Children's Book Award Honor Books recommendation in the Books for Older Children category.

In 2020, Padnani and reporter Julia Carmel produced a special section for the Times: "The A.D.A. at 30: Beyond the Law's Promise." Unusually, an audio version of every story in the series was created, and the special section was Braille. The project also resulted in a newsroom style guide for alt-text descriptions of images that illustrate stories online.

=== Overlooked ===
In 2018, together with the newspaper's gender editor, Jessica Bennett, Padnani initiated an obituary feature series, Overlooked, to publish obituaries on notable figures previously overlooked by the Times, such as Ida B. Wells and Sylvia Plath. The series opened with a straightforward statement of intent: "Since 1851, obituaries in the New York Times have been dominated by white men. Now we're adding the stories of remarkable women." The newspaper also invited readers to nominate overlooked individuals meriting commemoration.

Padnani has described her personal motivation for the series: "As a woman of color, I am pained when the powerful stories of incredible women and minorities are not brought to light". In 2019, students at Northwestern University created a musical based on the Overlooked series. In a talkback after the performance, Padnani said that while the response from readers was very positive, some Times staff had criticized Overlooked as "self-flagellation of the New York Times." In a Q&A with the Society of Professional Journalists Washington, D.C. chapter in 2020, Padnani said that after the series began, many readers thanked her "for giving these people a voice," while others said the series "wouldn't make up for" more than a century "of [the Times] doing it the wrong way."

The Overlooked series is in the process of being adapted into a Netflix show and several books. In 2023, Ten Speed Press published Overlooked: A Celebration of Remarkable, Underappreciated People Who Broke The Rules and Changed the World, authored by Padnani with the New York Times Obituaries Desk.

== Awards and honors ==
Padnani, along with Veronica Chambers and Anika Burgess of The New York Times, won the Newspapers feature award at the Newswomen's Club of New York's 2020 Front Page Awards for their work on the Mrs. Files series, a collection of essays and poems surrounding the title of "Mrs." and its role in the identity of women.

Padnani gave a TED talk in June 2019 discussing Overlooked, as part of the TED Salon: Trailblazers.

== Books ==
- (with Veronica Chambers, Jennifer Schuessler, Jennifer Harlan, Sandra E. Garcia and Vivian Wang) Finish the Fight! The Brave and Revolutionary Women Who Fought for the Right to Vote. HMH Books, 2020. ISBN 9780358408307
- (with the New York Times Obituaries Desk) Overlooked: A Celebration of Remarkable, Underappreciated People Who Broke The Rules and Changed the World. Clarkson Potter/Ten Speed, 2023. ISBN 9781984860422
