= Bobby Garnett =

American clothier (1949–2016)

- Garnett around 2010
- Born: Robert Charles Garnett III; July 13, 1949; Boston, Massachusetts, U.S.
- Died: May 19, 2016 (aged 66); Boston, Massachusetts, U.S.
- Occupation: Clothier

Robert Charles Garnett III (July 13, 1949 – May 19, 2016) was an American clothier. His vast clothing collection was regularly used in the film industry to outfit actors in period costumes. Over four decades, he owned several clothing stores on the East Coast. One of his customers was Ralph Lauren.

== Life and career ==
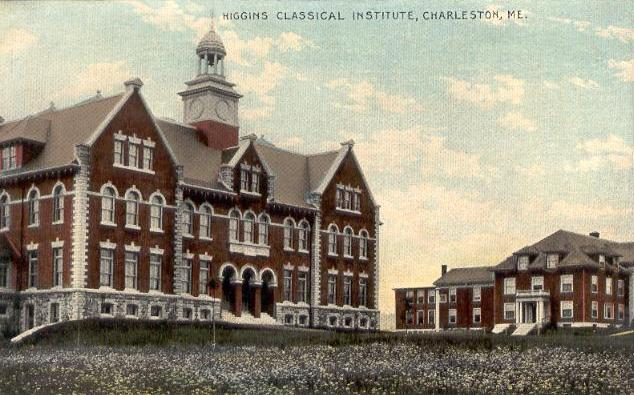
Higgins Classical Institute, the boarding school in Maine attended by Garnett

Robert Charles Garnett III, sometimes known as Bert, was born in 1949 in Boston, Massachusetts, to Robert Charles Garnett Jr. and Sylvia Francis, the first of their two sons. A brother, Wayne, followed. His father, who died in 2003, was a naval architect; his mother, who died in 2020, aged 96, taught in nursery school during her children's formative years, and also had an interior-design business.

Garnett attributes his love of clothing to his mother: "She dragged my brother and I around every department store – Filene's Basement, Gilchrist's, R. H. White," he said in 2002. "She knew good stuff." By the time he was in his mid-teens, he was wearing the same clothes as that of men twice his age: gabardine jackets and cotton trousers.

Aged 16, Garnett was working at Krackerjacks, a newly opened mod clothing shop on Mass Ave in Cambridge, Massachusetts.

He graduated from the Higgins Classical Institute boarding school in Charleston, Maine, followed by two years at Gordon College in Massachusetts (in part, he says, to avoid the Vietnam War draft).

In 1969, Garnett left college, where he had been running Awo, a leather-goods shop, out of his dormitory room. This was followed in 1971 by Muddy Rudder Trading in Brookline Village, Massachusetts, and, in 1974, by Uptown Strutters Ball, a vintage clothing store in Provincetown, Massachusetts. In the 1980s, it also had locations in Allston and on Newbury Street in Boston.

He operated a regular booth at the Brimfield Antique Show in Brimfield, Massachusetts, which caught the attention of designers and buyers from Manhattan. Ralph Lauren was one of his many customers.

Garnett's costumes were used in around fifty movies, including Mermaids, Casino, Ali, Seabiscuit, The Aviator and Walk the Line.

In 1995, after a stint on Staniford Street in Boston's West End, he relocated to Boston's South End, opening Bobby From Boston on Thayer Street. It was the first appointment-only vintage showroom in the country. In 2002, he converted it into a retail location. Its name was inspired by a comment from a person he walked by on a visit to London. They looked at the way he was dressed and asked, "Are you Bobby from Boston?"

Garnett was an Anglophile, as demonstrated by his collection of Arsenal F.C. jerseys.

=== Marriage and family ===
He married Connie Avdoulos, of Ames, Iowa, with whom he had a daughter.

== Death ==
Garnett died in 2016, of renal disease. He was 66.

His daughter, who had worked alongside him since 1998, took over the business. The South End location was closed, leaving its warehouse showroom in Lynn, Massachusetts, as the sole outlet.

=== Legacy ===
In 2026, the New York Times included Garnett in its Overlooked No More obituaries feature.
