= Jessica Bennett =

Jessica Bennett may refer to:

- Asia Carrera or Jessica Bennett (born 1973), American former pornographic actress
- Jessica Bennett (Passions), a character on Passions
- Jessica Bennett, guitarist for Lash
- Jessica Bennett (journalist), American journalist and author
