= Rowland Hussey Macy =

American businessman (1822–1877)

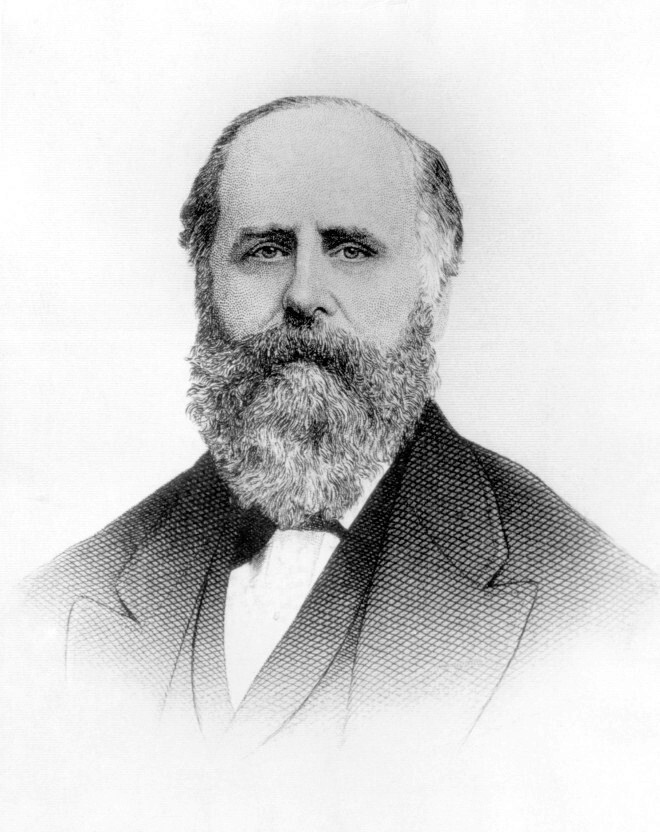
- Macy in 1858
- Born: August 30, 1822; Nantucket Island, Massachusetts, U.S.
- Died: March 29, 1877 (aged 54); Paris, France
- Resting place: Woodlawn Cemetery, Bronx
- Known for: Macy's
- Spouse: Louisa Houghton (m. 1844)
- Children: 3
- Relatives: Margaret Getchell (third cousin 2x removed)

Rowland Hussey Macy Sr. (August 30, 1822 – March 29, 1877) was an American businessman who founded the department store chain Macy's. He is credited with being one of the first major retailers in the United States to adopt the innovative Quaker principle of ensuring fair and equal access to merchandise for all members of the public by adopting a universal one-price merchandising policy in all of his stores.

== Life and career ==
Macy was the fourth of six children born to a Quaker family on Nantucket Island, Massachusetts. At the age of fifteen, he worked on the whaleship Emily Morgan and had a red star tattooed on either his hand or his forearm (various versions as to the exact location of the marking have been reported). He married Louisa Houghton (1820–1888) in 1844, and had three children: Charles A. Macy (1845–1846); Rowland Hussey Macy Jr. (1847–1878); and Florence Macy (1853–1933), who married James F. Sutton.

He and his brother, Charles, opened a dry goods store in Marysville, California, shortly after the city was founded at the height of the Gold Rush in 1850. Charles stayed in Marysville after the store failed, but Rowland headed east. Between 1843 and 1855, Macy opened four retail dry goods stores, including the original Macy's store in downtown Haverhill, Massachusetts, established in 1851 to serve the mill industry employees of the area. They all failed, but he learned from his mistakes. Macy moved to New York City in 1858 and established a new store named "R.H Macy Dry Goods" at Sixth Avenue on the corner of 14th Street, significantly north of other dry goods stores of the time. On the company's first day of business on October 28, 1858, sales totaled $11.08, equal to $411.56 today.

As the business grew, Macy's expanded into neighboring buildings, opening up more and more departments, and used publicity devices such as a store Santa Claus, themed exhibits, and illuminated window displays to draw in customers. It offered a money back guarantee, although it only accepted cash into the 1950s. The store also produced its own made-to-measure clothing for both men and women, assembled in an on-site factory. The store moved several times before arriving at its current Herald Square location in 1902.

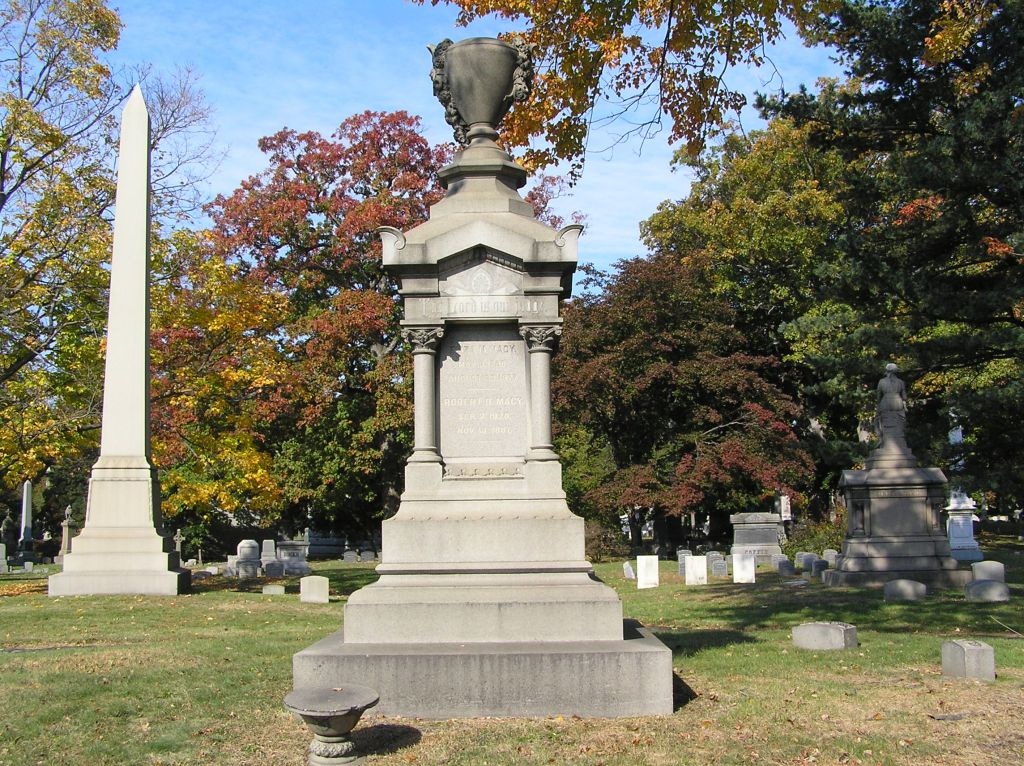
R.H. Macy's monument at Woodlawn Cemetery in the Bronx

In 1875, Macy took on two partners Robert M. Valentine (1850–1879), a nephew; and Abiel T. La Forge (1842–1878) of Wisconsin, who was the husband of cousin Margaret Getchell.

=== The Macy Co. and Quakerism ===
R. H. Macy is credited with being one of the first major retailers to promote a woman, Margaret Getchell, into an executive position as early as 1866. He is also credited with being one of the first major retailers in the United States to adopt the Quakers' preference for offering one-price merchandising in his stores nationwide, while also utilizing advertising to promote specific prices for specific items.

In later decades during World War II, under the leadership of Jack I. Straus, his company expressed confidence in the future success of his retail stores even as access to European wholesale markets deteriorated. Insisting that "we are not sentimental visionaries but hard-headed merchants", the Macy Co. increased its purchase of wholesale products into South American markets during the war. while also making an appeal for Americans of both North and South America to embrace mutual friendship by noting that:

The many grave problems that face the world today place a new emphasis on the word AMERICAN. In the Western Hemisphere we have come to the realization that if we would solve those problems successfully, we must face them not as North Americans or South Americans, but as Americans All ... Talk is cheap and good will makes fine diplomatic conversation, but friendship does not live on promises and there can be unity only when there is knowledge, understanding, and a free and profitable exchange of the products of the hands and hearts of men.

External videos
- You may see Macy's Latin-American Fair in the OCIAA documentary film Pan-American Bazar (1942) Here

By 1942, the Macy Company formed a collaboration with a young Nelson Rockefeller at the United States Office of the Coordinator of Inter-American Affairs (OCIAA) and Terig Tucci at CBS's La Cadena de las Americas to support Franklin D. Roosevelt's Good Neighbor Policy by hosting the Macy's Latin American Fair his flagship store at Herald Square. The event has been described as one of the largest cultural events organized by a department store during this period and attracted an audience of over 800,000 guests. Timed to coincide with the Inter-American Conference in Rio de Janeiro, the exhibition showcased art, architecture, fine cuisine, fashion, literature, merchandise, and music from throughout South America in exhibits which were replicated in other retail outlets throughout the United States. It included a construction of The Temple of Jewels and plazas of Rio de Janeiro. In addition, the OCIAA produced a documentary film Pan-American Bazaar to describe the exhibits. Macy's exhibits were presented under the patronage of Eleanor Roosevelt and diplomatic ambassadors from nations throughout South America.

== Honors ==
In 2008 the United States House of Representatives passed a resolution on the 150th anniversary of the founding of the Macy's Department store and to honor its founder R. H. Macy. The resolution noted that the "struggles of R. H. Macy & Co. are representative of all American small businesses and indicate the intense drive and spirit of our nation's entrepreneurs." In addition, Macy was recognized for being the first major retailer to promote a woman, Margaret Getchell, into an executive position. He was also cited for adopting an innovative one-price merchandise system and the use of advertising to quote specific prices for specific items. The Macy company was also recognized for establishing a robust supplier diversity program in later decades which assisted small minority-owned businesses in creating a successful business relationship with large scale retailers.

== Death ==
Macy died on March 29, 1877, in Paris of Bright's disease. He was interred in the Woodlawn Cemetery in The Bronx. His will was probated on May 1, 1877, and he left his wife, Louisa H. "absolutely, all the paraphernalia, wearing apparel, watches, rings, trinkets, jewels, and personal ornaments reputed to belong to her, and during her life, the use of all the household furniture, books, clocks, bronzes, and works of art." At her death this was to pass to his daughter, Florence. He left only a small annuity for his son. The following year, in 1878, Macy's partner La Forge died, and the third partner, Valentine, died in 1879. Ownership of the store passed to the Macy family until 1895, when it was sold to Isidor and Nathan Straus.

== In popular culture ==
- A fictional, reimagined "R. H. Macy" (depicted as alive and running the company seventy years after the historical Macy's death, or possibly a fictitious descendant with the same name) was portrayed in the 1947 movie Miracle on 34th Street by character actor Harry Antrim. In subsequent adaptations of the story, the character was played by Don Beddoe in an episode of The 20th Century-Fox Hour in 1955, Hiram Sherman in a 1959 TV movie, and David Doyle in a 1973 TV film.

== See also ==
- R.H. Macy and Company Store (building) for the history of the flagship store on Herald Square in Manhattan
- Macy's for a history of the chain
- Macy's, Inc. for a history of Federated Department Stores, owners of Macy's
