= Telephone operator =

Telephone operator may refer to:

== Telecommunications ==
- Switchboard operator, a person who provides assistance to telephone callers
- Telephone switchboard, the plug and cord system telephone operators use
- Traffic Service Position System, the modern successor to the telephone switchboard
- Operator assistance, the various services an operator provides
- Telephone company, an entity that offers telephone services to subscribers
  - Mobile network operator, a phone carrier

== Film ==
- The Telephone Operator (1925 film), a German silent comedy film
- The Telephone Operator (1932 film), an Italian comedy film
- Telephone Operator (film), a 1937 American drama film
- The Telephone Operator (1954 film), a West German musical romance film

== Music ==
- "Telephone Operator", a song by Pete Shelley from the 1983 album XL1

== See also ==
- Operator (disambiguation)
