= Switchboard operator =

Former telephony occupation

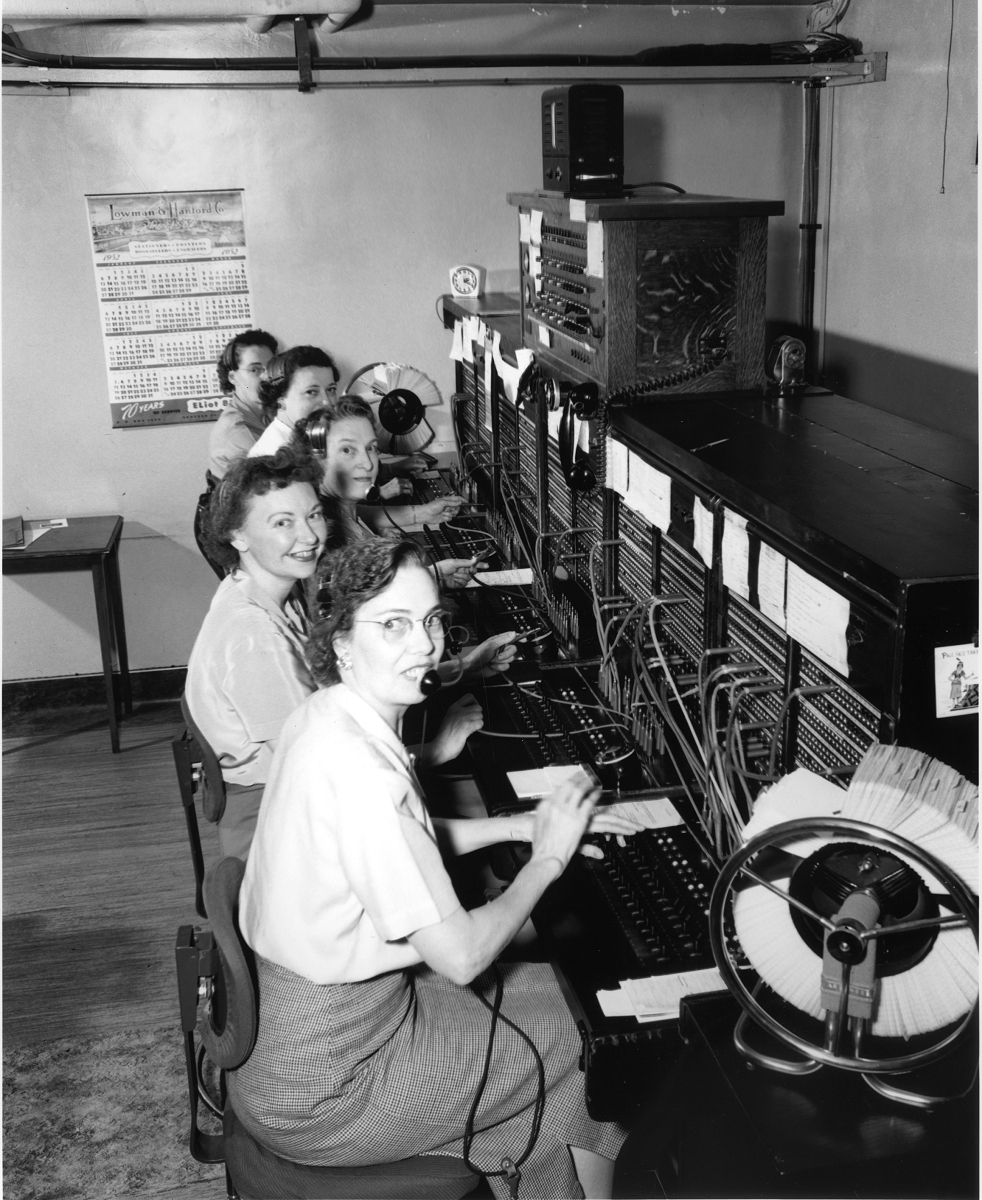
- Seattle telephone operators in a private branch exchange in 1952

Occupation
- Activity sectors: Telecommunications

Description
- Competencies: Operator assistance
- Related jobs: Call centre

In the early days of telephony, companies used manual telephone switchboards, and switchboard operators connected calls by inserting a pair of phone plugs into the appropriate jacks. They were gradually phased out and replaced by automated systems, first those allowing direct dialing within a local area, then for long-distance and international direct dialing.

== Description ==
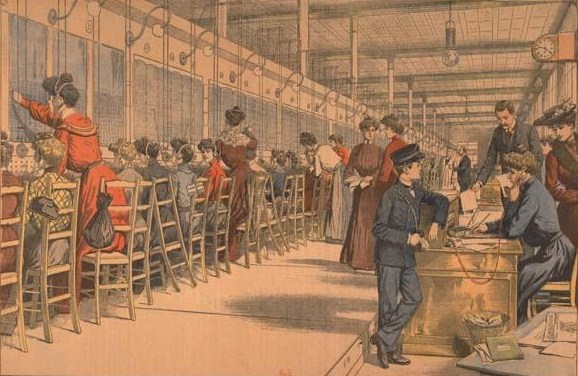
Paris telephone exchange, 1900

A typical manual telephone switchboard has a vertical patch panel containing an array of jacks with a desk in front. The desk has a row of switches and two rows of plugs attached to cables that retract into the desk when not in use. Each pair of plugs was part of a cord circuit with a switch associated that let the operator participate in the call or ring the circuit for an incoming call. Each jack had a light above it that lit when the customer's telephone receiver was lifted (the earliest systems required the customer to hand-crank a magneto to alert the central office and, later, to "ring off" the completed call). Lines from the central office were usually arranged along the bottom row. Before the advent of operator distance dialing and customer direct dial (DDD) calling, a switchboard operator would work with their counterparts in distant central office to complete long-distance calls. Switchboard operators are typically required to have very strong communication skills.

Before the advent of automatic exchanges, an operator's assistance was required for anything other than calling telephones across a shared party line. Callers spoke to an operator at a central office who then connected a cord to the proper circuit in order to complete the call. Being in complete control of the call, the operator was in a position to listen to private conversations. Automatic, or dial, systems were developed in the 1920s to reduce labor costs as usage increased, and to ensure privacy to the customer. As phone systems became more sophisticated, less direct intervention by the telephone operator was necessary to complete calls. With the development of computerized telephone dialing systems, many telephone calls which previously required live operators could be placed directly by calling parties without additional human intervention.

As well as the people that were employed by the public networks, operators were required at private branch exchanges (PBX) to answer incoming calls and connect them to the correct extensions. Today, most large organizations have direct inward dialing, or direct dial-in. Smaller workplaces may have an automated system which allows callers to enter the extension number of the called party, or a receptionist who answers calls and performs operator duties. Depending on the employment setting, the roles and level of responsibilities of a PBX operator can vary greatly, from performing wake-up calls in a hotel to coordinating emergency responses, dispatching, and overhead paging in hospitals. Operators employed in healthcare settings may have other duties, such as data entry, greeting patients and visitors, taking messages, triaging, or performing after-hours answering service. Experienced, well-trained operators generally command higher salaries.

== Services ==
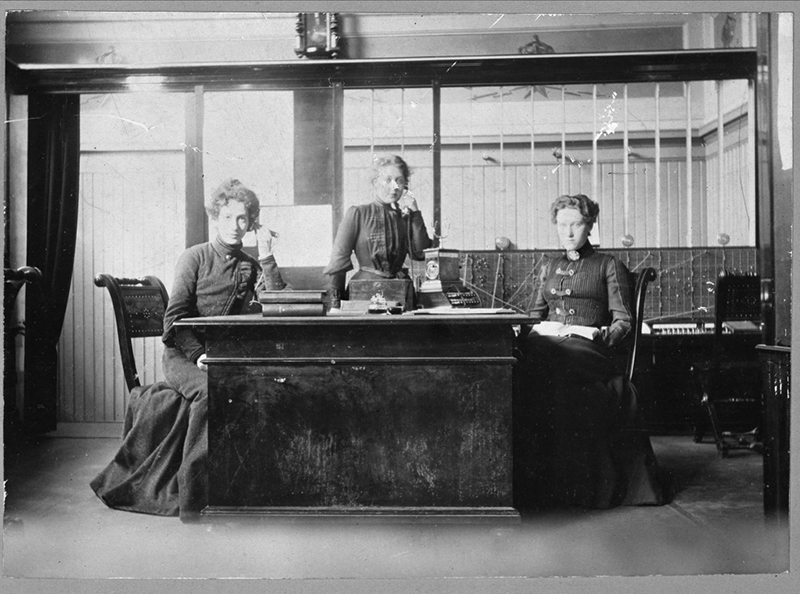
Telephone operators in Stockholm, Sweden 1902–1903

Telephone operators historically provided a wide range of call-handling and billing services beyond simply connecting calls. Operator assistance included station-to-station calls, in which charges began when anyone answered the called telephone, and person-to-person calls, where billing began only after a specified individual was reached. Operators also handled collect calls, billed to the called party, third-number or third-party calls billed to another telephone number, and calls charged to telephone credit cards or hotel accounts. Additional services included time and charges, in which the operator recorded the duration and cost of a call, and operator-assisted conference or sequence calls involving multiple parties. In areas with limited telephone access, operators could also arrange messenger calls, in which a messenger notified the recipient to come to a telephone at a scheduled time.

Operators also performed a variety of supervisory and emergency functions. These included busy line verification (BLV), in which an operator checked whether a line was busy or out of order, and busy line interruption (BLI), in which the operator interrupted an existing call to request that the line be cleared for an emergency call. Before the introduction of universal emergency telephone numbers such as 911, operators were responsible for routing emergency calls to police, fire, ambulance, or military authorities. Operators additionally provided directory assistance, rate quotations, and general information services, and in many telephone systems served as the primary point of contact for customer assistance and call troubleshooting.

== History ==
=== 19th century ===
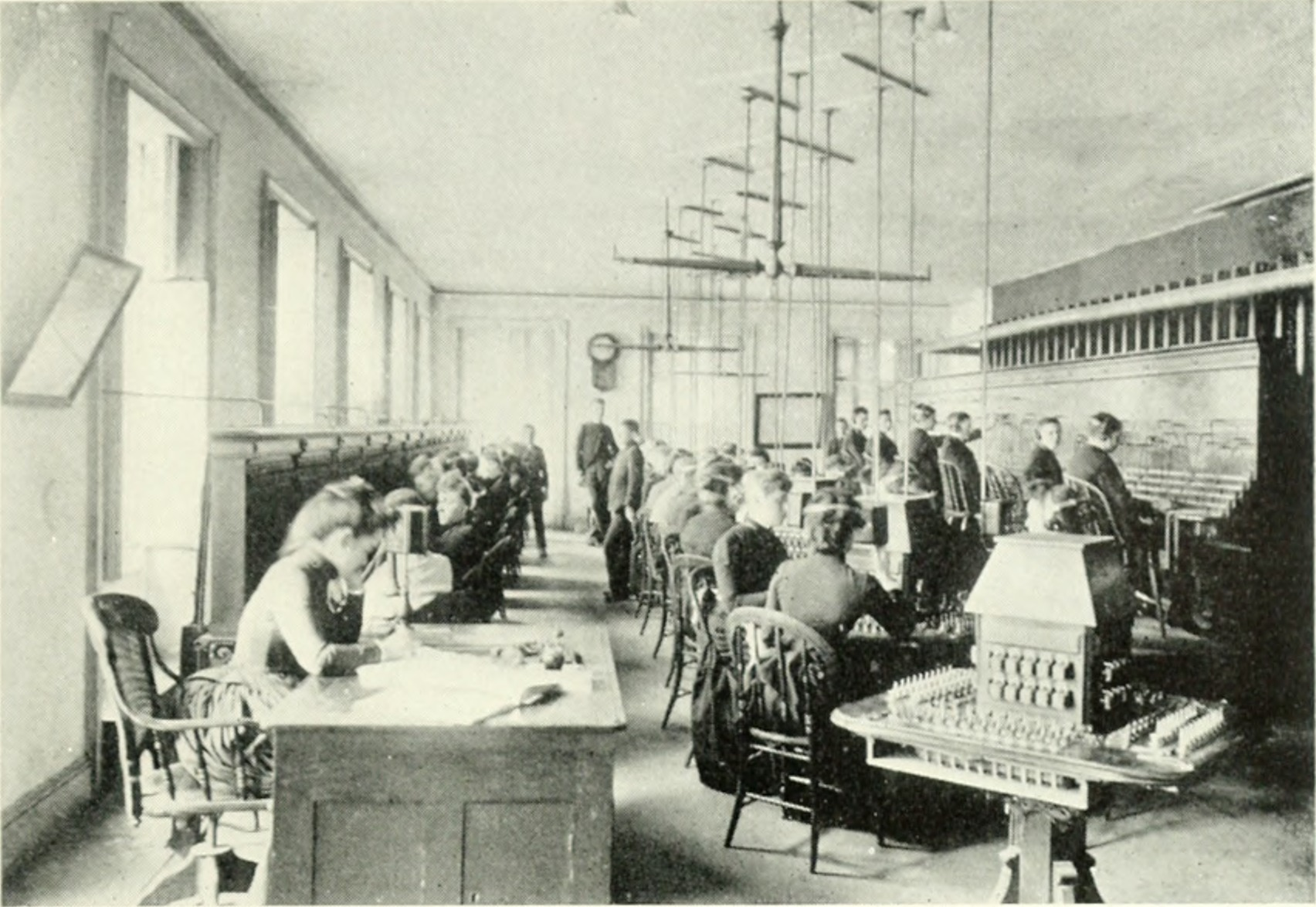
New York telephone exchange in the 1880s, with both men and women as operators

In January 1878 George Willard Croy became the world's first telephone operator when he started working for the Boston Telephone Dispatch company.

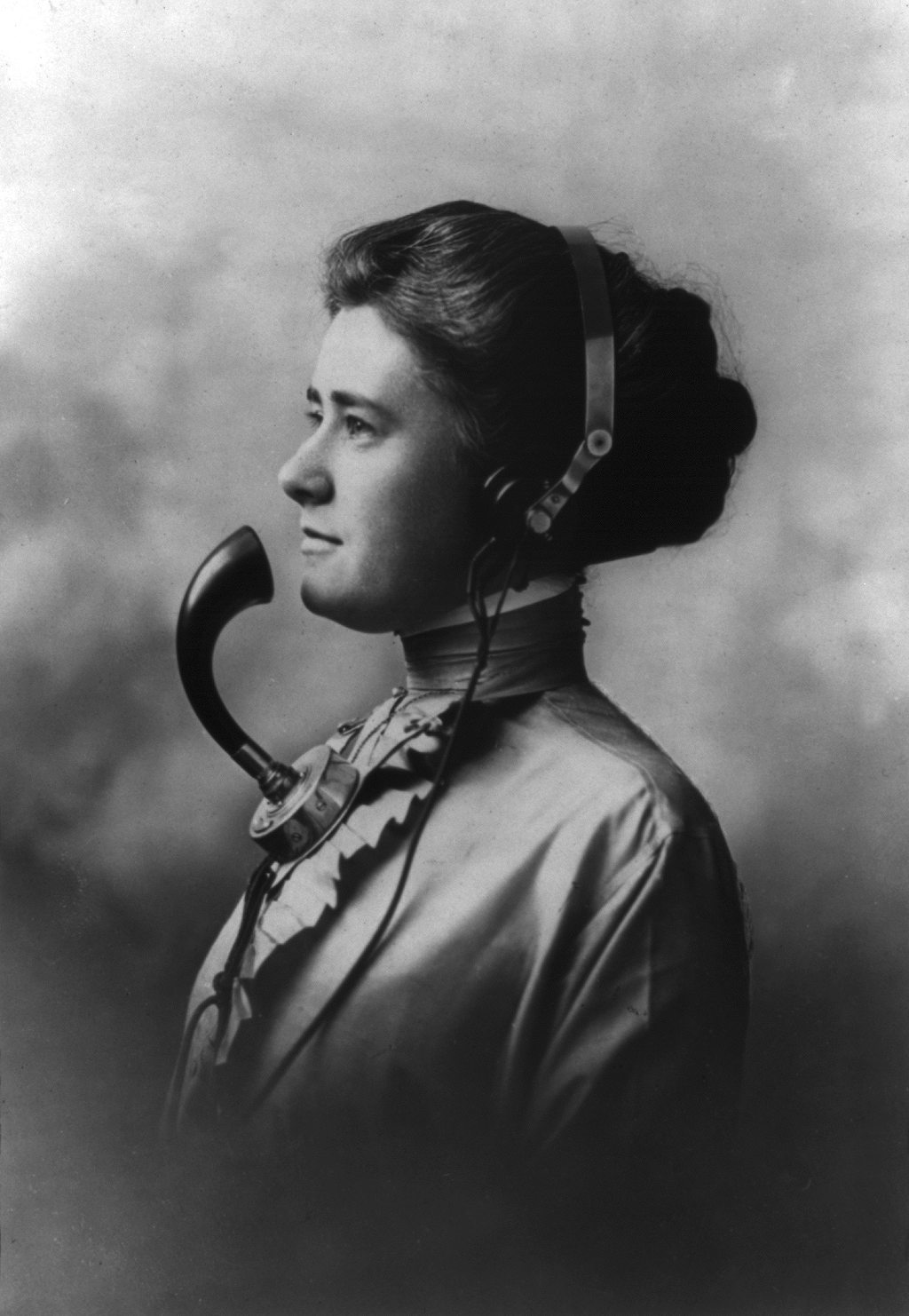
United States phone operator in 1911

Emma Nutt became the first female telephone operator on 1 September 1878 when she started working for the Boston Telephone Dispatch company, because the attitude and behavior of the teenage boys previously employed as operators was unacceptable. Emma was hired by Alexander Graham Bell and, reportedly, could remember every number in the telephone directory of the New England Telephone Company. More women began to replace men within this sector of the workforce for several reasons. The companies observed that women were generally more courteous to callers, and women's labor was cheap in comparison to men's. Specifically, women were paid from one half to one quarter of a man's salary.

Harriot Daley became the first telephone switchboard operator at the United States Capitol in 1898.

=== 20th century ===
Julia O'Connor, a former telephone operator, led the Telephone Operators' Strike of 1919 and the Telephone Operators' Strike of 1923 against New England Telephone Company on behalf of the IBEW Telephone Operators' Department for better wages and working conditions. In the 1919 strike, after five days, Postmaster General Burleson agreed to negotiate an agreement between the union and the telephone company, resulting in an increase in pay for the operators and recognition of the right to bargain collectively. However, the 1923 strike was called off after less than a month without achieving any of its goals.

In the United States, any switchboard operator employed by any independently owned public telephone company with no more than seven hundred fifty stations were excluded from the Equal Pay Act of 1963.

On October 11, 1983, in Bryant Pond, Maine, Susan Glines became the last switchboard operator for a hand-crank phone when that exchange was converted. Manual central office switchboards continued in operation at rural points like Kerman, California, and Wanaaring, New South Wales, as late as 1991, but these were central-battery systems with no hand-cranked magnetos.

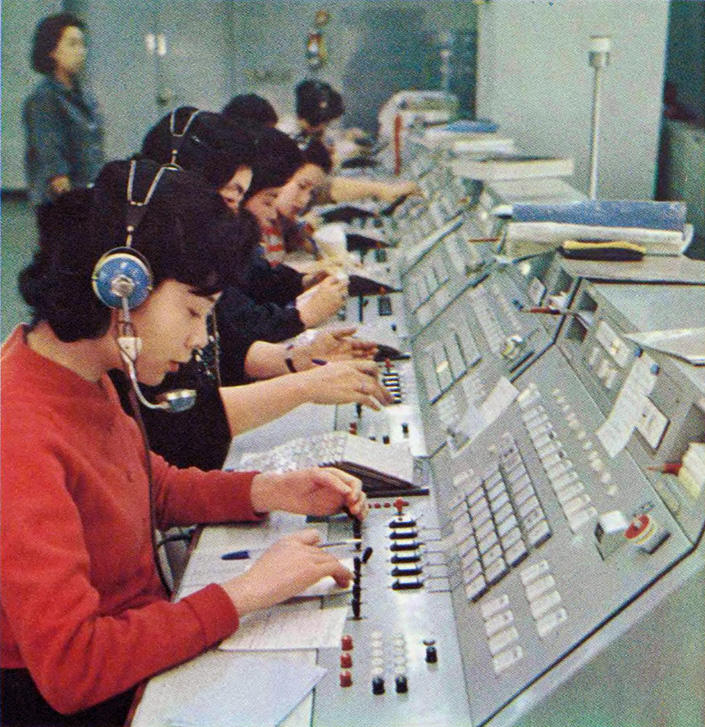
Operators at an international telephone exchange in 1967 in Japan at KDD, Japan's only international telephone company at the time. Replaced by International direct dialing which allows international calls to be placed without an operator.

=== 21st century ===
In 2023, the US Bureau of Labor Statistics estimated 43,830 operators of telephone business systems equipment or switchboards were employed. Making an average yearly salary of $40,020 USD.

According to a 2024 study, the mechanization of switchboard operations harmed the economic outcomes of incumbent telephone operators, but did not harm the employment prospects of young women overall, as future cohorts of young women entered into other growing economic sectors.

== Military service ==
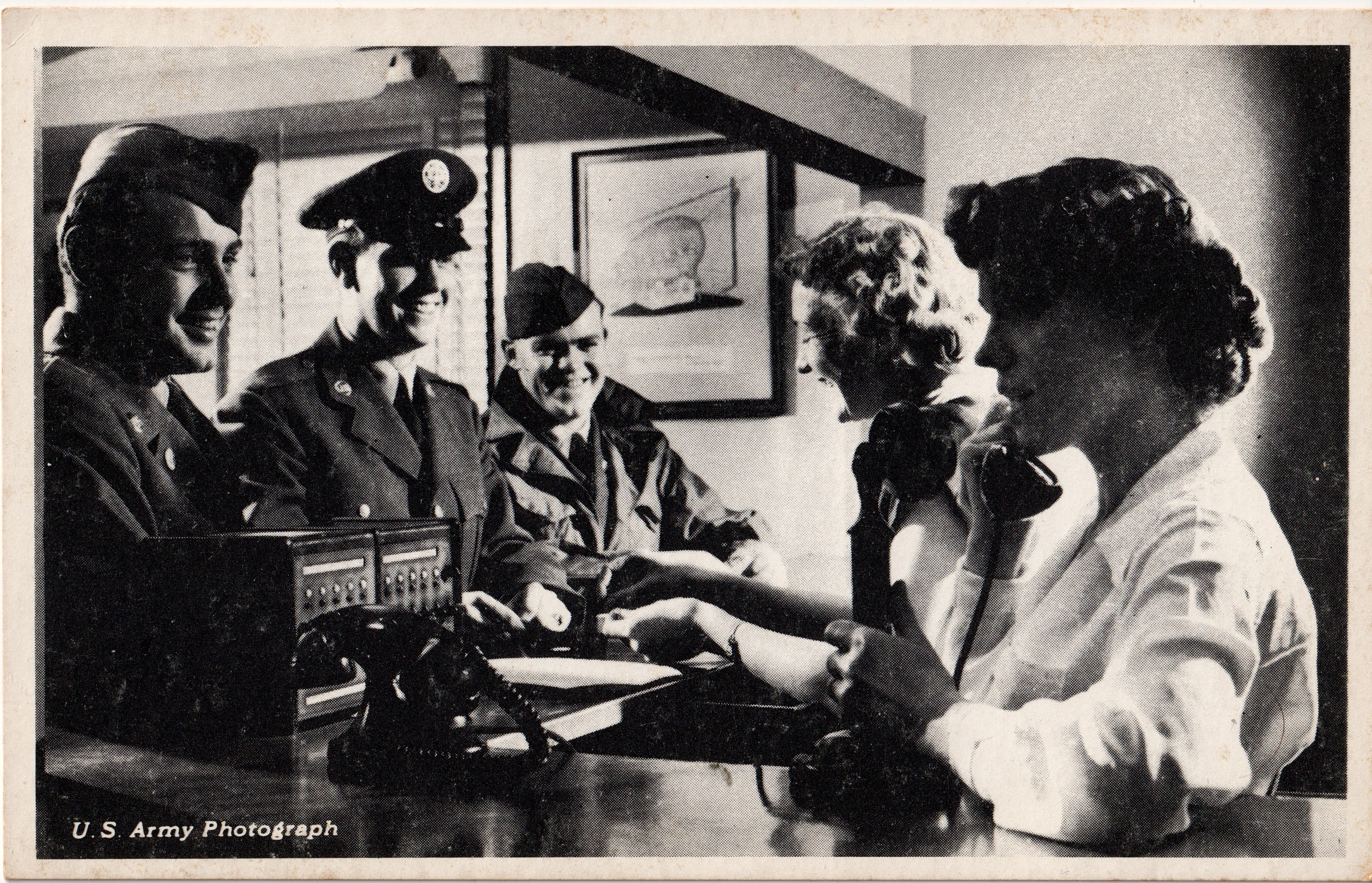
Operators assist US Army soldiers in making a telephone call at Fort Dix, 1940s or 1950s

During World War I bilingual switchboard operators sent to France, designated the "Women of the Signal Corps Female Telephone Operators Unit" of the American Expeditionary Forces in 1917–1919. They would colloquially be known as the Hello Girls. These operators were not formally recognized for their military service until 1978.

Male switchboard operators would be present in World War II alongside female operators serving in the Women's Army Corps. With the WAC facilitating communications between US participants and Washington, D.C. during the Potsdam Conference.

== Notable switchboard operators ==
Author Dorothy M. Johnson worked as a relief switchboard operator as a teenager in Whitefish, Montana, in the early 1920s. Full-time operators were paid roughly $50 a month at this time.

== See also ==
- Operator assistance (includes access numbers)
- Traffic Service Position System the successor to the switchboard
- Private branch exchange
- Telephone operator (disambiguation)
- Telephone switchboard
- Telephone in United States history
- List of obsolete occupations
