= Rose Zar =

Polish Holocaust survivor and human rights activist

Rose Zar (July 27, 1922 – November 3, 2001) was a Holocaust survivor and human rights activist.

== Biography ==
After World War II, she published In the Mouth of the Wolf, which won the Association of Jewish Libraries's Best Book Award, and toured the world educating young people about the war and sharing her story. In the Mouth of the Wolf is still taught in schools throughout the United States and Israel. Even 26 years after the first publication of her biography, her story remains culturally relevant. As of October, 2018, Zar's book was listed as the best seller in teen and young adult Jewish literature on Amazon.

In 2018, Zar was honored in The New York Times as part of their Overlooked No More obituary feature, and noted as a remarkable person who would have been covered in her own time if she had been born male. Melissa Eddy, with Overlooked, for The Times, noted that Zar's experience differed from "Anne Frank and thousands of other Jews who spent all or part of World War II sequestered in attics, caves or sewers" because she survived the Holocaust by hiding in plain sight. She attributed her survival to her father's advice. He taught her that if she was ever in trouble, the best thing to do is to hide "in the mouth of the wolf" and watch that it doesn't devour you.

== Awards ==
- Association of Jewish Libraries's Best Book Award
