= Elizabeth A. Gloucester =

American businesswoman

Elizabeth Gloucester
- Born: Elizabeth Amelia Parkhill; 1817; Richmond, Virginia, U.S.
- Died: August 9, 1883 (aged 65–66); Brooklyn, New York City, U.S.
- Occupations: Businesswoman, abolitionist

Elizabeth Amelia Gloucester (née Parkhill; 1817 – August 9, 1883) was one of the wealthiest black African-American women at the time of her death and was a supporter of the Underground Railroad and a business owner.

== Life and career ==
She was born in 1817 in Richmond, Virginia, as Elizabeth Amelia Parkhill to a freedwoman. Little is known about her father, but census records listed that she was "mulatto" which implies she might have had a white father. When her mother died when she was still young, she went to live with Rev. John Gloucester Sr. and married his youngest son, James Gloucester, in 1838. She developed her business skills by selling secondhand clothing and then operating a furniture store on West Broadway.

Gloucester ran 15 boarding homes in New York and they lived in Brooklyn from 1855. Her husband founded the Siloam Presbyterian Church and she helped to pay for the building of the church. They hosted abolitionist John Brown, and she contributed to his causes. She purchased the Hamilton Club and turned it into an upscale boarding house called the Remsen House, which had a mostly white clientele. She hosted Frederick Douglass, John Brown and many others at the house and held meetings for the Freedman's Friend Society, Ladies National Union Fair, and Union Soldier Association. Following her death, two of her daughters continued to run the Remsen House for some years, but the building was eventually demolished.

Through the church, the Gloucesters carried out their abolitionist convictions by making it a stop on the Underground Railroad.

She led the efforts to raise money for the Colored Orphan's Asylum in Weeksville, Brooklyn which was founded in 1866.

== Death and legacy ==
Gloucester died on August 9, 1883, of pneumonia. She was interred at Green-Wood Cemetery in Brooklyn. In her obituary, The Brooklyn Eagle wrote, "She came to be known to every one in Brooklyn, New York, the State and in fact throughout a great part of the country." At the time of her death, Gloucester's properties were worth about $300,000 ($10 million today), making her perhaps the wealthiest Black woman in America at the time. Newspapers called her "the remarkable colored woman." She had six children: Emma, Stephen, Elizabeth, Eloise, Charles and Adelaide.
