= Cheryl Marie Wade =

American disability activist

Cheryl Marie Wade (March 4, 1948 – 2013), who was often referred to as the "Queen Mother of Gnarly," was a disability activist born and raised in California. She had rheumatoid arthritis, a condition that severely limited her mobility and led her to be a lifelong wheelchair user. She advocated for disabled people, specifically disabled women, through her art and performances.

== Early life and death ==
Cheryl Marie Wade was born March 4, 1948, in Vallejo, California. She belonged to a working-class family – her mother worked as a bookkeeper and her father as a salesman. She also had a younger brother. Her family life was difficult. The Wades struggled financially, both her parents were alcoholics, and she was often sexually assaulted at a young age by her father. Wade died in Berkeley, California, in 2013 due to complications with her rheumatoid arthritis at the age of 65.

== Education ==
Wade graduated from high school at Stanford Children’s Hospital. She had a short attempt at gaining a college education at the College of Marin, but was unable to continue due to the physical and emotional distress of her disability. Years later, after a knee surgery and obtaining an electric wheelchair, she would return to the College of Marin where she found much more success after her return and found a supportive community of other wheelchair users and disabled people. Wade went on to UC Berkeley after graduating from College of Marin. An important part of her education at Berkeley was through a resident program that assisted in independent living for disabled students. This would be a new and inspiring experience for Wade. She earned a Master’s Degree in psychology. At Berkeley, she discovered a group called “Wry Crips,” a women's disabilities group where members wrote and performed. Wade wrote and performed several pieces in her time at Berkeley, and later went on to found “Axis,” a dance troupe for disabled people.

== Rheumatoid arthritis ==
Wade’s Rheumatoid arthritis began to manifest around age 10, she specifically complained about the pain and swelling in her wrists, thumbs, and knees. This autoimmune disorder is characterized mainly by the inflammation and swelling it causes in the joints. Rheumatoid arthritis causes the immune system to attack its own body, so it can affect other systems in the body, such as the skin, lungs, and heart. Due to the severe discomfort and swelling of her joints, Wade began her part-time use of a wheelchair in high school, but it quickly became a full time accommodation. She would later be introduced to the electric wheelchair, a life changing step in her journey. She continued to be a wheelchair user for the remainder of her life.

== Activism, poetry, and performing ==
Wade’s return to the College of Marin led her to discover the Disabled Student’s Union, where she became President of the club and was also involved in the college’s student government. Wade continued to engage in student activism during her graduate studies at UC Berkeley, writing and performing pieces with the group “Wry Crips.” She based her characters and her performances on being sassy and larger than life, which she found to be freeing in the face of regular life experiences with disability. After leaving “Wry Crips,” Wade went on to write and perform in two one-woman shows, “A Woman with Juice” and “Sassy Girl: Memoirs of a Poster Child Gone Awry.” Wade’s shows were written to make people more aware of living as a woman with a disability. Her art was also unique in its use of videos as a form of media. Wade made videos that won several awards at film festivals, and her videos were also featured in New Mobility and Ms. Magazine. Outside of her art, she authored articles and opinion pieces on disability related issues. She often spoke of her experience with doctors, living in poverty, and being ignored or spoken over as a disabled woman. She used plain, yet strong, language to deliver her arguments and talk about her lived experiences.
