= Gilchrist's =

Boston department store

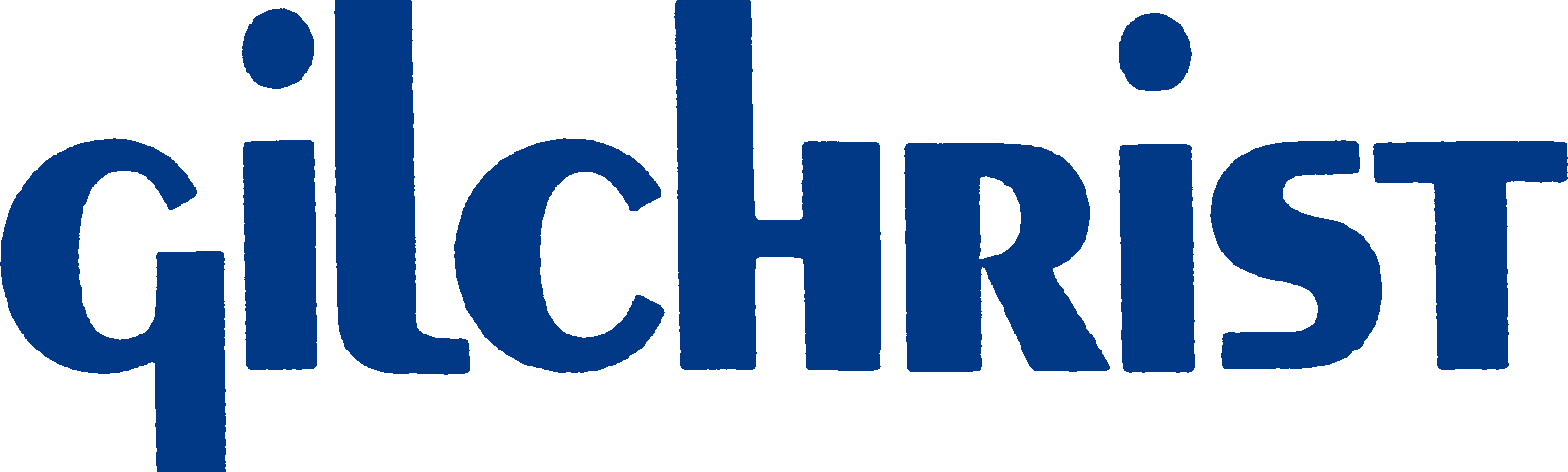
- Industry: Retail
- Founded: 1842
- Defunct: 1977
- Fate: Bankruptcy
- Headquarters: Boston, Massachusetts
- Products: Clothing, footwear, bedding, furniture, jewelry, beauty products, and housewares.
- Website: None

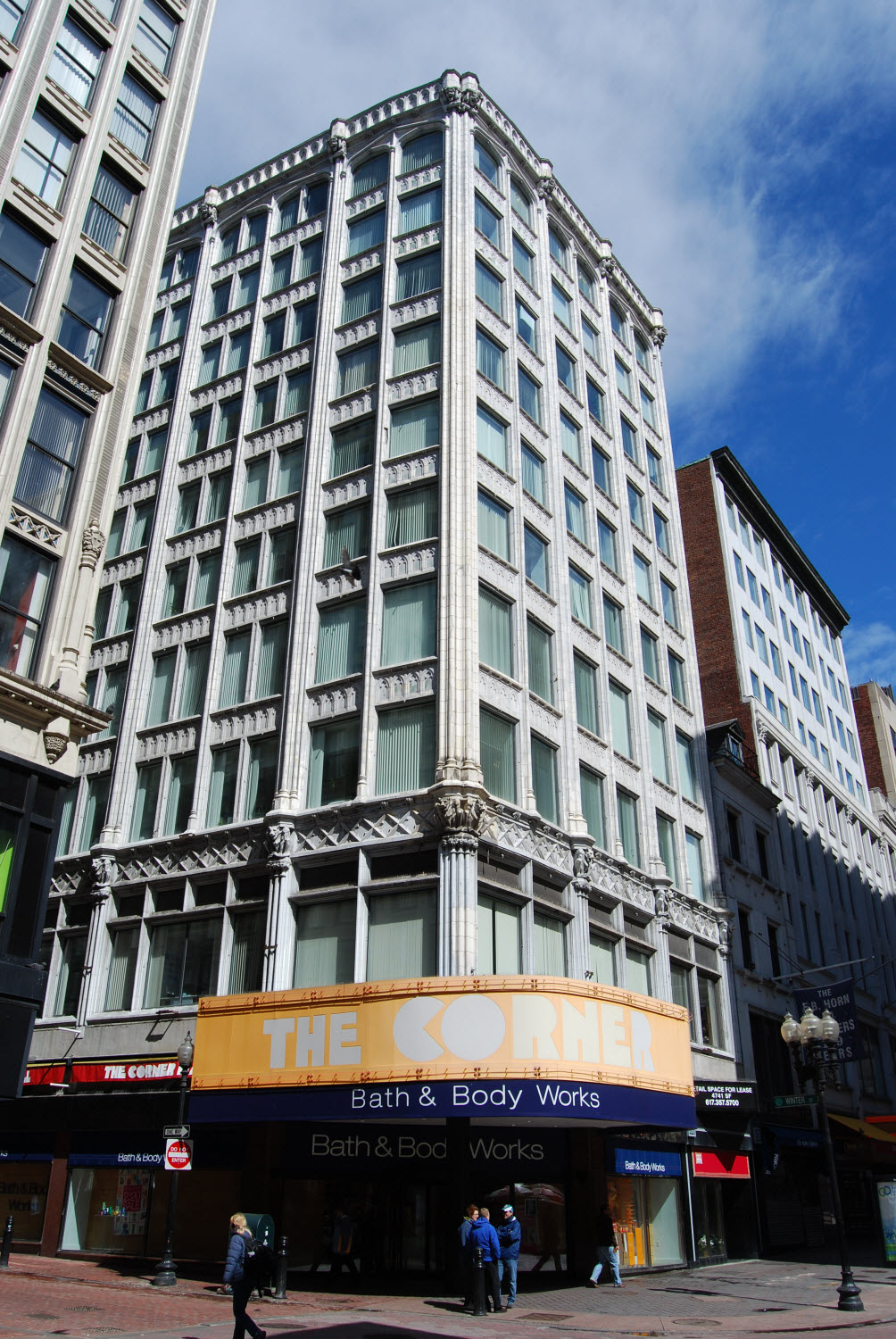
Former Gilchrist flagship store, Downtown Crossing, Boston

Gilchrist's was a Boston department store. Its flagship store was at the intersection of Washington and Winter Streets, across from both Filene's and Jordan Marsh in Downtown Crossing.

Gilchrist's was considered one of the big three stores (along with Filene's and Jordan Marsh) that dominated Boston's shopping district for so long. Gilchrist's opened in 1842, one year after Jordan Marsh in downtown Boston. Gilchrist's was not considered as high-end as its neighbors, but did just as well.

The history of the store traces back to a dry goods store on Washington Street in Boston owned by George Turnbull & Co. in the 1840s. R. Gilchrist worked at the store as a clerk and became a partner in 1855 when Turnbull retired.

In 1855, a store was opened at 5 Winter Street. In 1862 the firm became Churchill, Watson & Co, then in 1874, it became Churchill, Gilchrist & Smith. In 1877 it was R. & J. Gilchrist, in 1893 Gilchrist & Co., then Gilchrist Co. in 1901, with John Gilchrist as sole proprietor. The store was expanded in 1896. In March 1900, a new building, designed by architect Richard Clipston Sturgis, was opened on Washington Street. In 1905, the company leased a large property - the Century Building - on the corner of Washington and Winter Streets, next to the existing store, adding 50,000 square feet to its floor space.

Already in 1900, the building was referred to as "the daylight store" because of its large windows, and a well from the roof to the ground floor, that took advantage of natural light. This concept was developed further when the part of the store in the old Century building was torn down to construct a new building, which opened in October 1912. The new design included prismatic glass windows. Floor space was doubled and many new departments were added. A large new soda grill was a feature, as well as a public reception room and "hospitals" for men and women. Innovations for the convenience of customers included shopping cards, and shutes and dumb waiters to move goods.

In the 1940s Gilchrist's started to branch out into older suburban communities. By 1964 Gilchrist's had eight locations across the state of Massachusetts: Quincy, Brockton, Framingham, Medford, Waltham, Stoneham, Cambridge, and Dorchester. The company's store in Cambridge was located in the basement of the Star Market grocery store at the Porter Square shopping center.

The emergence of shopping malls led to the decline of the downtown stores. Gilchrist's took a back seat to the anchor stores until closing in 1977. Its flagship Downtown Crossing store was replaced with a shopping mall called The Corner in Gilchrist's original building.
