= Margaret Getchell =

American retail executive (1841–1880)

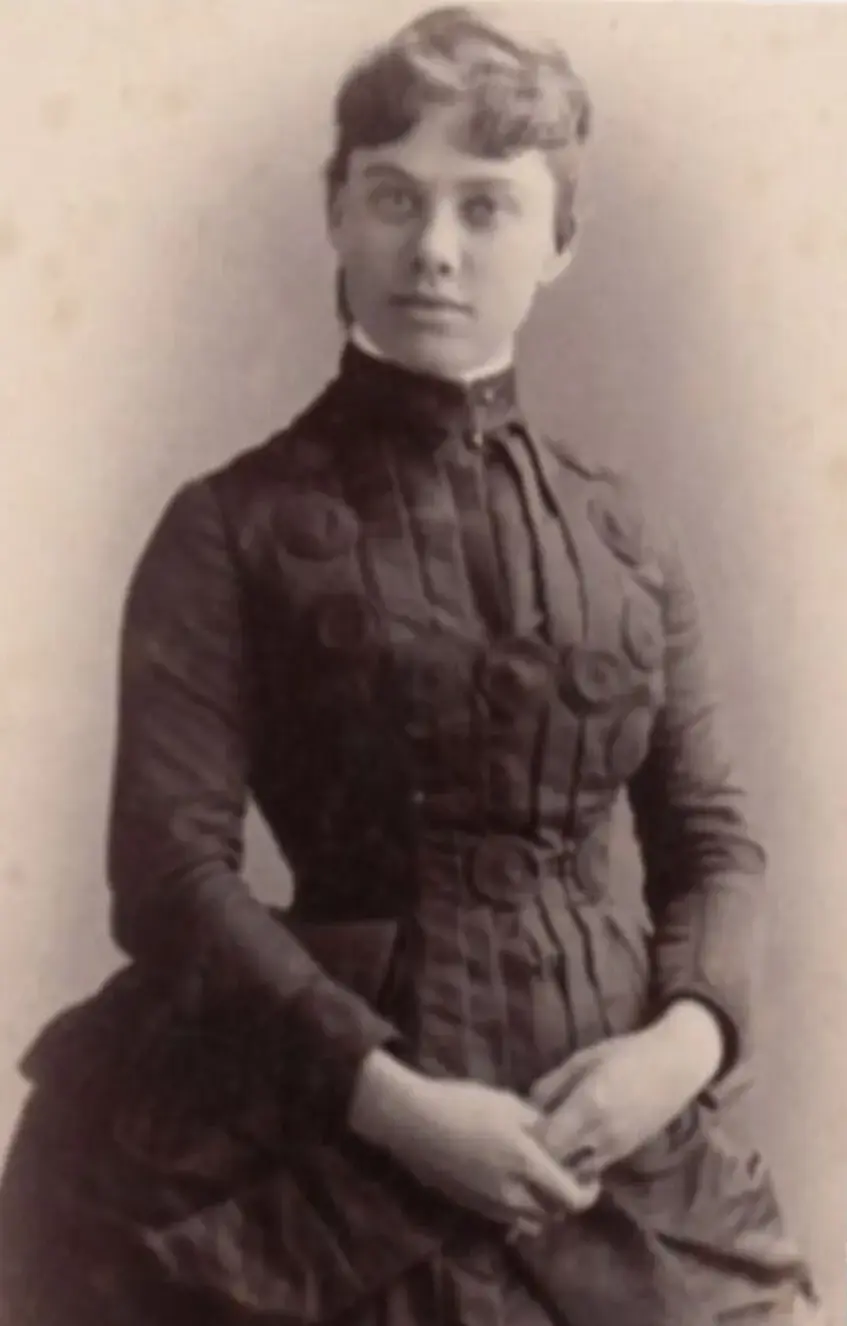
- Born: Margaret Swain Getchell; July 16, 1841; Fairhaven, Massachusetts, U.S.
- Died: January 25, 1880 (aged 38); New York City, U.S.
- Occupation: Business executive
- Employer: R.H. Macy & Co.
- Children: 6
- Relatives: Rowland Hussey Macy (third cousin twice removed)

Margaret Swain Getchell (July 16, 1841 – January 25, 1880) was an American business executive and one of the first women to hold an executive position in the retail industry. She worked at R.H. Macy & Co. where she managed store operations, expanded product offerings, and developed innovative marketing strategies. Her contributions helped establish Macy's as a major retail enterprise during the mid-19th century.

== Early life and education ==
Margaret Swain Getchell was born on July 16, 1841, in Fairhaven, Massachusetts. She was one of four children born to Barzillai Getchell, a sawmill operator originally from Brunswick, Maine, and Phebe Ann Pinkham, a native of Nantucket who later became a schoolteacher. Her family faced financial hardship after her father abandoned them to start another family in Maine, leaving Getchell’s mother to raise her and her two surviving siblings in Nantucket.

Getchell attended the Fair Street School in Nantucket, excelling in academics, particularly arithmetic, and graduating from high school at the age of 16. She was known on the island for her poetic talents and frequently wrote and recited poetry at local events. Following her graduation, she became a mathematics teacher, teaching on Nantucket and later in Lansingburgh, New York; Harlemville, New York; Lawrenceville, New Jersey; and Richmond, Virginia.

As a child, Getchell suffered an injury during a game of tag, hitting her head on a doorknob and leaving her partially blind in one eye. At the age of 19, she underwent surgery to replace the injured eye with a prosthetic. Her physician advised her to seek a profession that would be less taxing on her vision, prompting her to explore opportunities outside of teaching.

== Career ==
In 1860, Getchell moved to New York City and approached Rowland Hussey Macy, founder of R. H. Macy & Co., for employment. According to one source, Getchell and Macy were third cousins twice removed, sharing a common ancestor, Richard Macy. Despite lacking retail experience, her aptitude with numbers earned her a role as a cash clerk. Within two years, she was promoted to head bookkeeper, where she managed the store’s accounts and trained other employees.

Getchell was instrumental in expanding Macy’s inventory beyond its initial focus on dry goods to include departments for jewelry, home furnishings, toys, and children’s books. She proposed innovative marketing techniques, including creative window displays such as dressing cats in doll clothing to attract customers. Additionally, she suggested placing a soda fountain at the back of the store, requiring customers to pass other merchandise, which boosted sales. She also recommended adopting the red star logo, inspired by a tattoo on Macy’s hand, applying it to price tags and letterheads.

Getchell introduced early mail-order operations at Macy’s, enabling customers to order products from home, which was an innovative practice at the time. In 1866, she was promoted to superintendent of the store, becoming one of the first women to hold an executive position in the retail industry. As superintendent, she oversaw nearly 200 employees and managed the store’s daily operations.

Under her leadership, Macy’s sales and size tripled, and annual sales reached approximately $1 million. Her personal motto, “Be everywhere, do everything, and never forget to astonish the customer,” reflected her approach to retail and leadership.

In 1869, Getchell married Captain Abiel T. LaForge, a lace buyer at the store who later became a partner in the business. Despite her continued contributions, Getchell’s salary was eliminated in 1871 when her husband was promoted to partnership, reflecting the gender norms of the period. In 1873, while pregnant with her third child, Getchell managed the entire store for three months during her husband’s absence on a European buying trip. She continued to work part-time during busy periods, such as inventory.

== Personal life ==
Getchell and Abiel T. LaForge had six children, though one died in infancy. Her later years were marked by health struggles, including neuralgia and complications from childbirth. She suffered from heart failure and ovarian inflammation, dying on January 25, 1880, in her home in Manhattan at the age of 38.
