= Harriot Daley =

American telephone switchboard operator (1867-1957)

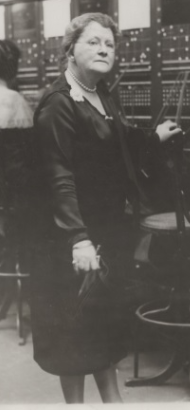
- Born: c. 1867; Portsmouth
- Died: November 1, 1957
- Occupation: Switchboard operator (1898–1945)

Harriot Daley (circa 1867 – November 1, 1957) was the first telephone switchboard operator at the United States Capitol. She was appointed as telephone switchboard operator at the Capitol in 1898.

Daley was born in Portsmouth, Virginia, the third of four children of David Jeremiah Godwin, a lawyer, judge, and Confederate Army colonel, and Lucrece Wilson.

In 2018 the New York Times published a belated obituary for her.
