= Ethel J. Lindgren-Utsi =

British anthropologist

Ethel John Lindgren
- Born: 1 January 1905; Evanston, Illinois
- Died: 23 March 1988 (aged 83); Aviemore
- Education: Newnham College, Cambridge
- Known for: nomadic Tungus
- Spouses: Oscar Mamen; Mikel Utsi
- Scientific career
- Fields: anthropology, ethnology

Ethel John Lindgren (later Mamen, later Utsi; 1 January 1905 – 23 March 1988) was an American-born British ethnologist and anthropologist who studied the customs of nomadic herders and shamanism in Manchuria apart from folkloristic studies. She was a major influence on a generation of English field anthropologists through her teaching at Cambridge University.

== Biography ==
Born in Evanston, Illinois, her father was John R. Lindgren, a Swedish-origin banker in Chicago who died when she was young; he was the founder of the State Bank of Chicago. Her mother, the pianist Ethel (Roe) Lindgren, then married the composer Henry Eichheim in 1917. The family travelled around the world. While still a child, on a trip to see the Great Wall of China, she decided that her interest was in the exploration of the Mongolian region. She was educated at Smith College, followed by Newnham College, Cambridge where she studied Chinese and psychology.

In 1927, she travelled to Urga (now Ulaanbaatar) and made later trips to Manchuria and studied nomadic Tungus. She was able to record shaman practices in the region, assisted by her first husband, Oscar Mamen. By 1934, Lindgren began to investigate reindeer nomadism in Swedish Lapland. She would later publish several works on the Reindeer Tungus of Manchuria, which included her doctoral dissertation on the subject. Lindgren conducted research in Siberia and was the first person to collect materials on the Polish anthropologist Maria Czaplicka and her research on the region. She authored three articles on the cultural contact between Evenks and Russian Cossacks. Part of her work on the Evenks was a photograph she captured in 1931 of the disk-shaped device called indaan, which is believed to be a simple model of the world used by reindeer herders. It also included her account of the Three-River Delta (TRD) Russians, which she said experienced periods of cultural and economic domination in their area of inhabitancy.

She continued to work in Cambridge University and worked as a lecturer in the faculty of archaeology and anthropology. Having identified with the British cause during the Second World War, she became a naturalized British citizen in 1940. After the war she married her second husband Mikel Utsi, a Saami reindeer breeder. They were involved in the reintroduction of reindeer into the Scottish Highlands in 1952.

== Publications ==
- North-Western Manchuria and the Reindeer-Tungus (1930)
- Field work in social psychology (1935)
- The shaman dress of the Dagurs, Solons and Numinchens in NW Manchuria (1935)
- An Example of Culture Contact without Conflict: Reindeer Tungus and Cossacks of Northwestern Manchuria (1938)

== See also ==
- Zakharia, Naï (22 December 2023). "Overlooked No More: Ethel Lindgren, Anthropologist of Reindeer Herding Cultures". The New York Times. ISSN 0362-4331.
