= Sinclair Clark =

- Born: Sinclair Nathaniel Clark; January 31, 1902; Barbados, West Indies
- Died: May 14, 1999 (aged 97); Bronx, New York
- Occupation: Taxidermist
- Known for: Taxidermy tanning
- Spouse: Marie Foster Clark (1904 - 1971)

Sinclair Nathaniel Clark (January 31, 1902, Barbados, West Indies – May 14, 1999, Bronx, New York) was a legendary taxidermy tanner, known throughout that industry for his expertise in tanning animal skins to give them the suppleness that taxidermists require to create lifelike, long-lasting displays. Tanning is the process of treating animal skins and hides for display and preservation. Because tanning is a behind-the-scenes operation of taxidermy, tanners are seldom known outside the industry.

== Early life ==
Clark was born on Jan. 31, 1902, in the Saint Andrew parish of Barbados to Lita and Grant Clark.

== Work ==
Clark’s work is on view in museums all over the world; his most famous work is "Henry," the African Bush elephant which has been displayed in the National Museum of Natural History in Washington, D.C., since 1959. He also tanned the skin of the famous racehorse Phar Lap, which has been on permanent display in the Museums Victoria in Melbourne, Australia since January 1933.

Some years after his 1924 emigration from Barbados to the United States through New York City's Ellis Island, Sinclair Clark learned tanning from taxidermist James L. Clark (no relation)—who himself had learned from Carl Akeley, considered to be the “father of modern taxidermy.” Akeley, whom Sinclair Clark had met his very first week of work at James L. Clark’s taxidermy studio, had recently proposed that the American Museum of Natural History (AMNH) build a Hall of African Mammals, and James Clark had begun working with Akeley on that project. As a result, it was Sinclair Clark who tanned the skins of the majority of the large mammals exhibited in the over 29 habitat dioramas of that hall, as well as of the original four of the herd of eight African elephants that comprise the hall's main exhibit. In rare archival footage, Sinclair Clark can be seen at work in the museum's 1927 film, "Modern Taxidermy: Mounting Indian Elephants for the American Museum of Natural History."

Akeley requested that Sinclair Clark accompany him on his 1926 African safari, but Sinclair’s mother forbade it. It turned out to be Akeley’s last safari; during the trip, he became ill and died in the Belgian Congo. In 1936, his proposed Hall of African Mammals opened in the American Museum of Natural History and was named The Akeley Hall of African Mammals in his honor.

An independent contractor, during his career Sinclair Clark worked with noted taxidermists, including Louis Paul Jonas of the world-famous Jonas Bros. Taxidermy Studio, which since 1908 has specialized in museum-quality taxidermy. (Stephen I. Horn, who succeeded co-founder John Jonas there, hired Sinclair Clark to run the Jonas Bros. tannery). And at the American Museum of Natural History, his tanning methods became the standard for all diorama animal exhibits, as noted in the project blog of the museum's Natural Science Conservation lab:

When considering the production and acquisition of historical taxidermy at the Museum, particularly for use in dioramas, the period of interest spans from approximately 1925 to 1965. Though we do not have a complete understanding of all the tanning methods in use at, and for, the Museum during this 40-year time frame, we were able to partner with a local tanner trained by Sinclair Clark, a renowned tanner who was on staff at the Museum around 1924–1927. Clark later set up tanneries in other locations, but maintained his relationship with the Museum tannery over a long period of time.

In general terms, Clark’s method involves the following:

The skin is salted to remove moisture and stabilize it prior to tanning

Tanning begins with rehydration in a saltwater bath until the skin is soft and pliable

It is next soaked in an acid pickle until swollen, and then shaved down on a fleshing machine or by hand

The skin is returned to the pickle, and, if needed, shaved again

The skin is then removed from the pickle and the acid is neutralized

Warmed oil is applied either by hand or with a “kicking” machine

The skin is left to sit overnight or for one day before being tumbled in hardwood sawdust until dry and soft.

== Awards / Recognitions ==
Throughout his career, Sinclair Clark mentored other taxidermists and helped them set up their studios. Following his death, the National Taxidermists Association created an annual award in his name—The Sinclair Clark Memorial Award—for excellence in taxidermy.

On July 24, 2021, during the 2021 National Taxidermists Association’s awards banquet, Sinclair Clark was officially inducted into the Taxidermy Hall of Fame (THOF) as an “historical nominee,” defined by the THOF as those recognized for their contributions to taxidermy 50 years before the current year election date.

He is the first black man to be so honored.

On February 18, 2025, the television program “CBS Mornings” aired a segment featuring New York Times obituaries editor Amy Padnani, which included an interview with Sinclair Clark’s granddaughter Diane Patrick as a descendant of one of the persons in the book. The interview took place at the American Museum of Natural History, in the Akeley Hall of African Mammals, beside the African Herd display for which Sinclair Clark tanned the skins of four of the eight elephants.

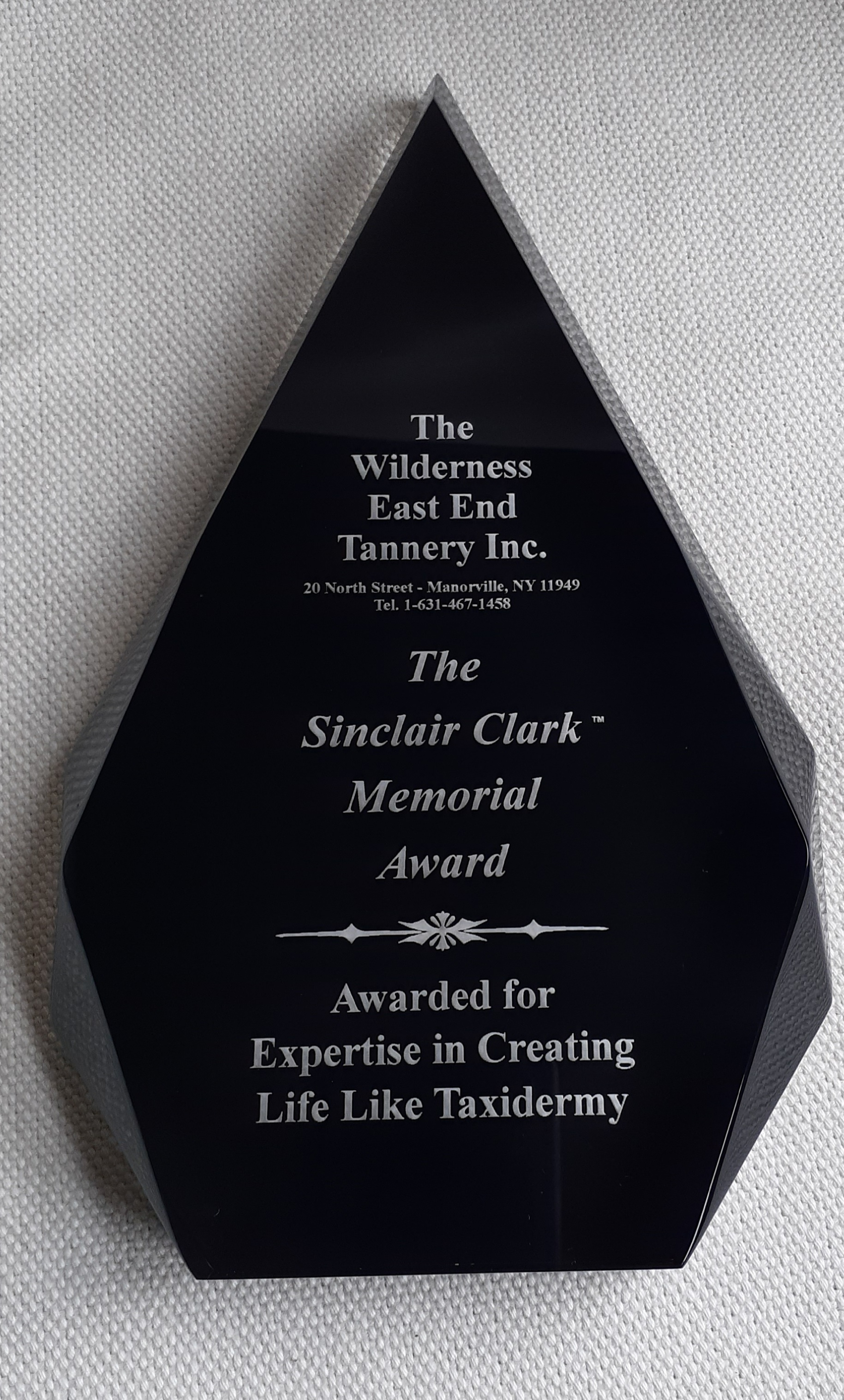
A "Sinclair Clark Memorial Award for Expertise in Creating Life Like Taxidermy".

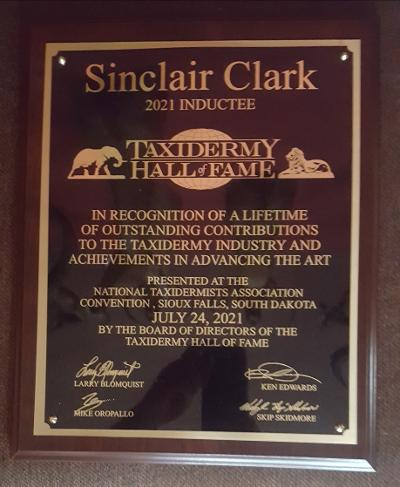
Taxidermy Hall of Fame plaque honoring Sinclair Clark, 2021 inductee
