= Jessica Bennett (journalist) =

American journalist and author

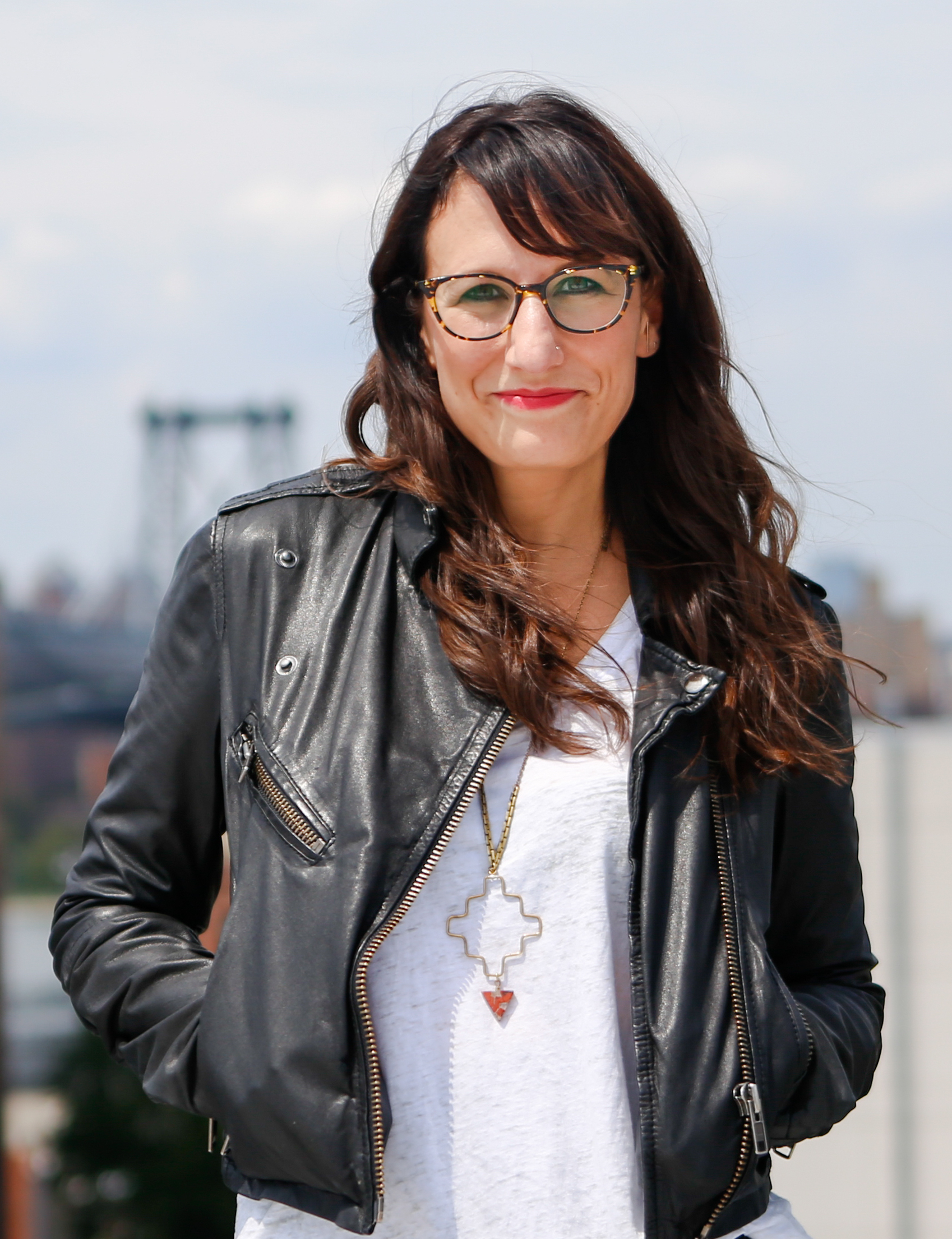
- Bennett in 2017
- Born: Seattle, Washington, U.S.
- Education: Boston University (BS)
- Occupation: Journalist
- Employer: The New York Times
- Awards: New York Press Club; Newswomen's Club of New York; GLAAD Media Award; International Center for Photography
- Website: jessicabennett.com

Jessica Bennett is an American journalist and author who writes on gender issues, politics and culture. She was the first gender editor of The New York Times and a former staff writer at Newsweek and columnist at Time. She is the author of Feminist Fight Club: A Survival Manual for a Sexist Workplace (HarperCollins, 2016) and This Is 18: Girls Lives Through Girls' Eyes (Abrams, 2019). She is an adjunct professor at the Arthur L. Carter Graduate School of Journalism at New York University.

== Personal background ==
Bennett grew up in Seattle, Washington, where she attended Garfield High School. She received a B.S. in journalism from Boston University, where she worked as a student reporter covering crime at The Boston Globe.

== Career ==
Bennett moved to New York City to become a research assistant to the Village Voice investigative reporter Wayne Barrett, longtime chronicler of corrupt city politics and politicians, including Rudy Giuliani and Donald Trump.

=== At Newsweek and Time ===
She went on to become a staff writer at Newsweek, where she spent six years. She won a New York Press Club award for her story on the Nikki Catsouras photographs controversy about a family's struggle to remove their daughter's gruesome death photos from the internet. She also wrote on LGBTQ issues, earning a GLAAD Award. In 2010, she and two colleagues wrote a cover story titled "Are We There Yet?" about the state of feminist progress for women journalists. The article appeared on the 40th anniversary of a landmark lawsuit against Newsweek, in which 46 female staffers had sued the company for gender discrimination in the first lawsuit of its kind, paving the way for women journalists. That story became a book, The Good Girls Revolt, by Lynn Povich and an Amazon TV series of the same name.

Bennett left Newsweek after it merged with The Daily Beast to become the executive editor of Tumblr and later worked briefly as an editor at Sheryl Sandberg's nonprofit foundation, Lean In, where she created the "Lean In Collection with Getty Images", a photo initiative to change the depiction of women and LGBTQ families in stock photography. She later became a columnist for Time.

=== At New York Times ===
For The New York Times, Bennett has been a writer and columnist for the Style section and a contributing editor for the News and Opinion sections. In 2017, she was appointed the newspaper's first gender editor.

In addition to her reporting, Bennett uses gender as a lens for buzzy projects that explore larger social issues. She launched the Times Overlooked obituaries project and published the perspectives of young women around the world through "This is 18", a photography project that became an international exhibit.

In the aftermath of #MeToo, she explored how college students were navigating Sexual consent on campus sexual consent on campus, and, in the pandemic, documented the plight of working mothers, for which she created a Primal Scream phone line. Bennett headlined The Times's women's conference, The New Rules Summit, in 2019, and guided the newspaper's coverage of the centennial of the 19th amendment.

=== Subjects ===
Bennett has written extensively on the #MeToo movement, including investigating allegations of sexual misconduct against the playwright Israel Horovitz, and reporting from the civil rape and defamation trial brought by E. Jean Carroll against Donald Trump.

She also reports on cultural trends. Among them: An attempt by Playboy to "rebrand" for millennials (and a similar effort by the Miss America pageant); a class at Smith college, led by the scholar Loretta Ross, to teach students to "call in" instead of calling each other out; columns on TikTok trauma; going to see the Barbie movie with the feminist scholar Susan Faludi, and her quest to find "fun" in a time of darkness

Bennett has profiled celebrities and public figures including Pamela Anderson, Amanda Knox, Monica Lewinsky, E. Jean Carroll, Jennifer Aniston and Katie Hill. She once wrote a viral piece about her Resting Bitch Face.

== Books and television ==
In 2016, Bennett published Feminist Fight Club: A Survival Manual for a Sexist Workplace, which was called "engaging, practical and hilarious" by Sheryl Sandberg and "a classic f--k you feminist battle guide" by Ilana Glazer.

She was editor of This Is 18: Girls Lives Through Girls' Eyes (Abrams, 2019), an expansion of the New York Times project of the same name.

In 2023, Bennett was the inspiration for a "feminist journalist" named "Jess Bennett" who appeared in season 3 episode 8 of The Morning Show. In the episode, Alex (Jennifer Aniston) lands the interview with the fictional Jess Bennett, who was the first person to predict the overturn of Roe v. Wade on her website. While discussing the Supreme Court, Jess calls Alex out on her potential biases, asking if she can actually speak truth to power on certain issues when she's sleeping with said power.

== Awards and honors ==
Bennett has been honored by the Newswomen's Club of New York, GLAAD, the New York Press Club and the International Center of Photography.
