= Jane Cain =

British speaking clock voice (1909–1996)

- Born: Ethel Jane Cain; 1 May 1909
- Died: 19 September 1996 (aged 87)

Ethel Jane Cain (1 May 1909 – 19 September 1996) was a British telephonist and actress, and the original voice of the speaking clock in the United Kingdom.

Working at London's Victoria Exchange, she was appointed on 21 June 1935 following a competition among GPO telephonists; there were nine finalists in total and the adjudication panel included leading actress Sybil Thorndike and Poet Laureate John Masefield, who announced that "She has a golden voice. It is beautiful." Her recording was used from 1936 until 1963, when it was replaced by Pat Simmons. She also made a record for the GPO, helping other staff members improve their speaking voices, and went on to become announcer for Henry Hall during his broadcast concerts.

Having been chosen as the 'Golden Voice Girl', in July 1935 she was offered the leading role in the Columbia Pictures film Vanity. Directed by Adrian Brunel, it began shooting at Walton-on-Thames in October and was first shown in December. Using the name Jane Cain as an actress, she then made her professional stage debut at the Open Air Theatre, Regent's Park on 17 July 1936, playing Celia in As You Like It. The Post Office had started its 'speaking clock' service on the 1st of the same month, over a year after her appointment had been announced.

In addition to working with regional repertory companies, notably a lengthy association with Scotland's Perth Theatre Company in the 1950s, she also appeared in such West End shows as A Soldier for Christmas (1944), Maigret and the Lady (1965) and The Sleeping Prince (1968). She also played supporting roles in such TV series as Starr and Company (1958) and Thirty-Minute Theatre (1961).

== See also ==
- Speaking clock
- Pat Simmons, second permanent voice
- Brian Cobby, third permanent voice
- Lenny Henry, comedian, temporary voice
- Alicia Roland, 12-year-old schoolgirl, temporary voice
- Sara Mendes da Costa, fourth permanent voice

| Preceded by Post created | Permanent voice of the British Speaking clock 1936–1963 | Succeeded by Pat Simmons |
