= Pat Simmons (voice actress) =

Pat Simmons (1920 – 29 October 2005) was the voice of the United Kingdom's Speaking Clock from 1963 until 1985.

A supervisor at a London telephone exchange, in 1963 Simmons won a £500 competition to replace Jane Cain, whose voice had been used since the service began in 1936. On 2 April 1985, Pat Simmons' last words on the clock were: "At the third stroke it will be 10:59 and 50 seconds", followed by the three pips and then the voice of Brian Cobby who succeeded her in the job.

In 2000, a project called TIM 2000 was run by the Telecommunications Heritage Group to recreate the Pat Simmons speaking clock. Around 75 electronic speaking clocks with the Pat Simmons voice were sold.

The Speaking Clock machine that was used by Pat Simmons was displayed on an edition of the BBC television programme, Antiques Roadshow, originally broadcast on 19 October 2008. It had been on display as a working machine at the museum of the British Horological Institute. About forty-four minutes into the programme, Alan Midleton, who had made past appearances as a watch and clock expert on the show in previous episodes but was appearing as a curator of the museum, claimed that the electric motor of the machine, which had been running at the institute, broke down on the same day that Pat Simmons died.

== See also ==
- Speaking clock
- Jane Cain, first permanent voice
- Brian Cobby, third permanent voice
- Lenny Henry, comedian, temporary voice
- Alicia Roland, 12-year-old schoolgirl, temporary voice
- Sara Mendes da Costa, fourth permanent voice

Preceded by Jane Cain	Permanent voice of the British Speaking clock 1963 – 2 April 1985	Succeeded by Brian Cobby
