= The Lively Arts =

- Starring: Henry Comer; Harry Mannis
- Country of origin: Canada
- Original language: English

Production
- Producers: Vincent Tovell; Barry Harris; Milan Chvostek
- Running time: 30 minutes

Original release
- Network: CBC
- Release: October 3, 1961 – June 24, 1964

The Lively Arts is a weekly half-hour CBC Television programme about arts and culture. It ran from October 1961 to June 1964. The show was composed of filmed and studio interviews, either produced by the CBC or purchased from the BBC and others.

== Episodes ==
=== 1963 ===
- January 15: Mexican sculpture, 7000 to 1500 BC
- January 22: A film tour of St. Paul's Cathedral, London, with architect Sir Basil Spence
- February 12: The photos of William Notman, selected from the McGill collection
- February 26: A documentary on R. York Wilson, explaining abstract art
- March 5: Music in America today, with composers Arthur Schwartz, Morton Gould, Aaron Copland, David Raksin
