= Victorian Telecommunications Museum =

Heritage telecommunications collection

Coordinates: 37°49′21.21″S 145°2′11.17″E

Mini telephone exchange

The Victorian Telecommunications Museum was a small museum in the Hawthorn Telephone Exchange, Burwood Road, Hawthorn, Victoria, Australia. It housed historical telecommunications equipment that had been used by what originally was called the Postmaster-General's Department. The department split in 1975 into Telecom Australia and Australia Post. In 1993 Telecom Australia was renamed Telstra after the merger of Telecom Australia and OTC (Overseas Telecommunications Corporation).

A fraction of the thousands of items housed were on display for visitors. One was a working mini telephone exchange with four old phones that could call each other. The visitor watched the exchange manually step up and click around as the numbers are dialled. The phones had all the original dial tones and rings that were standard for this equipment.

Mechanical speaking clock

The exhibits included one of the original mechanical speaking clocks, made with rotating glass discs. This was one (number 2) of the four Mark II machines produced in England for use in Australia, which were received in Australia in the early 1950s. The discs were originally read using an exciter and a detector made with valve technology. These devices are no longer available and, because all the originals had failed, replacements had to be fashioned using digital technology adapted to plug into the original valve sockets. This development has enabled the speaking clock to be restored to full operation.

The museum was managed by volunteers and closed at the end of 2019, when the National Communication Museum opened on the site in September 2024.

== Other Telstra museums ==
A Mark II speaking clock is still on display at the Telstra Museum, Bankstown, Sydney, next to the Bankstown Telephone Exchange, which is open to the public every Tuesday and Wednesday. This museum also is run by volunteers.

The Brisbane Telstra Museum is at Albion Telephone Exchange, Albion, Brisbane. Volunteers also run this site, which is open to the public every Wednesday.
