= Vanity (1935 film) =

- Jane Cain and Martin Lewis in the film
- Directed by: Adrian Brunel
- Written by: Ernest Denny (play)
- Produced by: George Smith
- Starring: Jane Cain; Percy Marmont
- Cinematography: Geoffrey Faithfull
- Production company: George Smith Productions
- Distributed by: Columbia Pictures
- Release date: December 1935
- Running time: 76 minutes
- Country: United Kingdom
- Language: English

Vanity is a lost 1935 British comedy film directed by Adrian Brunel and starring Jane Cain, Percy Marmont and John Counsell. It was written by Ernest Denny based on his play.

== Preservation status ==
The British Film Institute National Archive holds no film or video materials.

== Plot ==
A conceited actress, convinced of the general adoration in which she is held, fakesher own death in order to gratify herself by observing the depth of grief caused by her demise. However the actual reactions to the "news" prove to be far from what she had expected.

== Cast ==
- Jane Cain as Vanity Faire
- Percy Marmont as Jefferson Brown
- H. F. Maltby as Lord Cazalet
- John Counsell as Dick Broderick
- Moira Lynd
- Nita Harvey
- Martin Lewis

== Production ==
The film was a quota quickie production, made at Nettlefold Studios in Walton-on-Thames for distribution by Columbia Pictures.

It is the only known cinema credit for Jane Cain, who went on to achieve a degree of immortality in British culture as 'the girl with the golden voice', becoming the original voice of the speaking clock in the United Kingdom between 1936 and 1963.

== Reception ==
Kine Weekly wrote: "Silly, incredible drama of life in the theatrical world, clumsily and hastily designed to cash in on the publicity accorded Jane Cain, known in telephone circles as the girl with the golden voice. She should be heard and not seen until she acquires more acting experience, while the rest of the players are well advised to think twice before again supporting such a stunt, if they value their reputations. Sheer tosh from start to finish, the film must emphatically be dismissed as useless."

The Daily Film Renter wrote: "Story designed to introduce Jane Cain, the 'Girl with the Golden Voice,' who fails to make much impression in unconvincing dual roles. Trite dialogue, mediocre direction, amateurish acting, and general lack of inspiration put this into class for uncritical patrons only. ... Dialogue, direction and acting are poor, while there is a ludicrous prologue in which Percy Marmont introduces Miss Cain to the audience, thus, it seems, jeopardising all chances of the ensuing film registering conviction."

== Bibliography ==
- Low, Rachael. History of the British Film: Filmmaking in 1930s Britain. George Allen & Unwin, 1985.
