= Greenwich Time Signal =

Series of six pips broadcast by the BBC

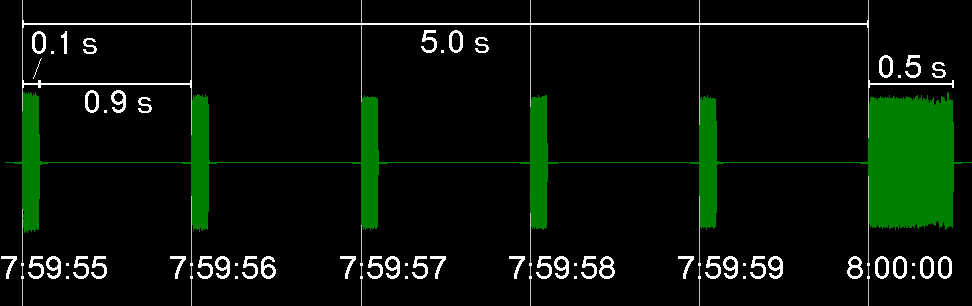
Graph of the six pips

The Greenwich Time Signal (GTS), popularly known as the pips, is a series of six short tones (or "pips") broadcast at one-second intervals by many BBC Radio stations to mark the precise start of each hour. The pips were introduced in 1924, generated by the Royal Observatory, Greenwich, and from 1990 were generated by the BBC in London. The broadcast pips replaced an electrical time coordination system based on the railway telegraph network, which itself was an extension of the mechanical time balls in Portsmouth (1829) and later Greenwich (1833), which enabled navigators aboard ships moored in those places to set their chronometers for the determination of longitude on voyages.

== Structure ==
Greenwich Time Signal
The five pips and one beep

There are six pips (short beeps) in total, which occur on each of the 5 seconds leading up to the hour and on the hour itself. Each pip is a 1 kHz tone (about a fifth of a semitone above musical B5) the first five of which last a tenth of a second each, while the final pip lasts half a second. The actual moment when the hour changes—the "on-time marker"—is at the very beginning of the last pip.

When a leap second occurs (exactly one second before midnight UTC), it is indicated by a seventh pip. In this case the first pip occurs at 23:59:55 (as usual) and there is a sixth short pip at 23:59:60 (the leap second) followed by the long pip at 00:00:00. The possibility of an extra pip for the leap second thus justifies the final pip being longer than the others, so that it is always clear which pip is on the hour. Before leap seconds were conceived in 1972, the final pip was the same length as the others. Although "negative" leap seconds can also be used to make the year shorter, this has never happened in practice.

Although normally broadcast only on the hour by BBC domestic radio, BBC World Service uses the signal at other times as well. The signal is generated at each quarter-hour and has on occasion been broadcast in error.

== Usage ==
The pips are available to BBC radio stations every fifteen minutes, but, except in rare cases, they are only broadcast on the hour, usually before news bulletins or news programmes. Normally, BBC Radio 4 broadcast the pips every hour except at 18:00 and 00:00 (at the start of the Six O'Clock News and Midnight News respectively), and at 22:00 on Sundays (at the start of the Westminster Hour) when they are replaced by the striking of Big Ben at the Palace of Westminster. On BBC Radio 2, the pips are used at 07:00, 08:00 and 17:00 on weekdays, at 07:00 and 08:00 on Saturdays and at 08:00 and 09:00 on Sundays.

The pips were used on BBC Radio 1 during The Chris Moyles Show at 06:30 just after the news, 09:00 as part of the "Tedious Link" feature, 10:00 (at the end of the show) and often before Newsbeat. As most stations only air the pips on the hour, The Chris Moyles Show was the only show where the pips were broadcast on the half-hour. Chris Moyles continues to use the pips at the beginning of his show on Radio X. The pips were previously used at 19:00 on Saturday evenings at the start of Radio 1's 12-hour simulcast with digital station BBC Radio 1Xtra, which broadcasts the remixed version of the pips at the start of David Rodigan's show. The pips were also used on Radio 6 Music for a rare occurrence. It took place between 2009 and 2011 on weekdays and the pips were played at 10:00 (end of the breakfast show) and at 19:00 (end of the drive show).

BBC Radio 3 and BBC Radio 5 Live do not broadcast the pips, though Radio 5 Live did so at 06:00 between 2000 and 2008.

The BBC World Service broadcasts the pips every hour.

Pips were also heard on many BBC Local Radio stations until the introduction of a new presentation package in 2020. A rare quarter-hour Greenwich Time Signal was heard at 05:15 weekdays on Wally Webb's programme on local radio in the east of England until it ended in March 2020, as part of his "synchronised cup of tea" feature.

In 1999, pip-like sounds were incorporated into the themes written by composer David Lowe to introduce BBC Television News programmes. They are still widely used today over theme music of many programmes in BBC One, BBC Two, BBC World News and BBC News.

The BBC does not allow the pips to be broadcast except as a time signal. Radio plays and comedies which have fictional news programmes use various methods to avoid playing the full six pips, ranging from simply fading in the pips to a version played on On the Hour in which the sound was made into a small tune between the pips. The News Quiz also featured a special Christmas pantomime edition where the pips went "missing", and the problem was avoided there by only playing individual pips. The 2012 project Radio Reunited used the pips to commemorate 90 years of BBC Radio.

=== Cultural references ===
Bill Bailey's BBC Rave includes the BBC News theme, which incorporates a variant of the pips (though not actually broadcast exactly on the hour). The footage can be seen on his DVD Part Troll.

As a contribution to Comic Relief's 2005 Red Nose Day, the BBC developed a "pips" ringtone which could be downloaded.

== Accuracy ==
The pips for national radio stations and some local radio stations are timed relative to UTC, from an atomic clock in the basement of Broadcasting House synchronised with the National Physical Laboratory's Time from NPL and GPS. The broadcast pips' usefulness for time calibration is diminished by the time lags involved in digital broadcasting.

The BBC compensates for the time delay in both broadcasting and receiving equipment, as well as the time for the actual transmission. The pips are timed so that they are accurately received on long wave as far as 160 kilometres (100 mi) from the Droitwich AM transmitter, which is the distance to Central London.

Newer digital broadcasting methods have introduced even greater problems for the accuracy of use of the pips. On digital platforms such as DVB, DAB, satellite and the Internet, the pips—although generated accurately—are not heard by the listener exactly on the hour. The encoding and decoding of the digital signal causes a delay of a few seconds, and certain devices and services buffer many more seconds which can vary based on network conditions. In the case of satellite broadcasting, the travel time of the signal to and from the satellite could add another 0.56 seconds (up to about 281 ms each way).

Today, many accurate time transfer technologies exist without relying on signals embedded in programme audio, for example: NTP, IRIG, RDS, or various other radio technologies.

== History ==
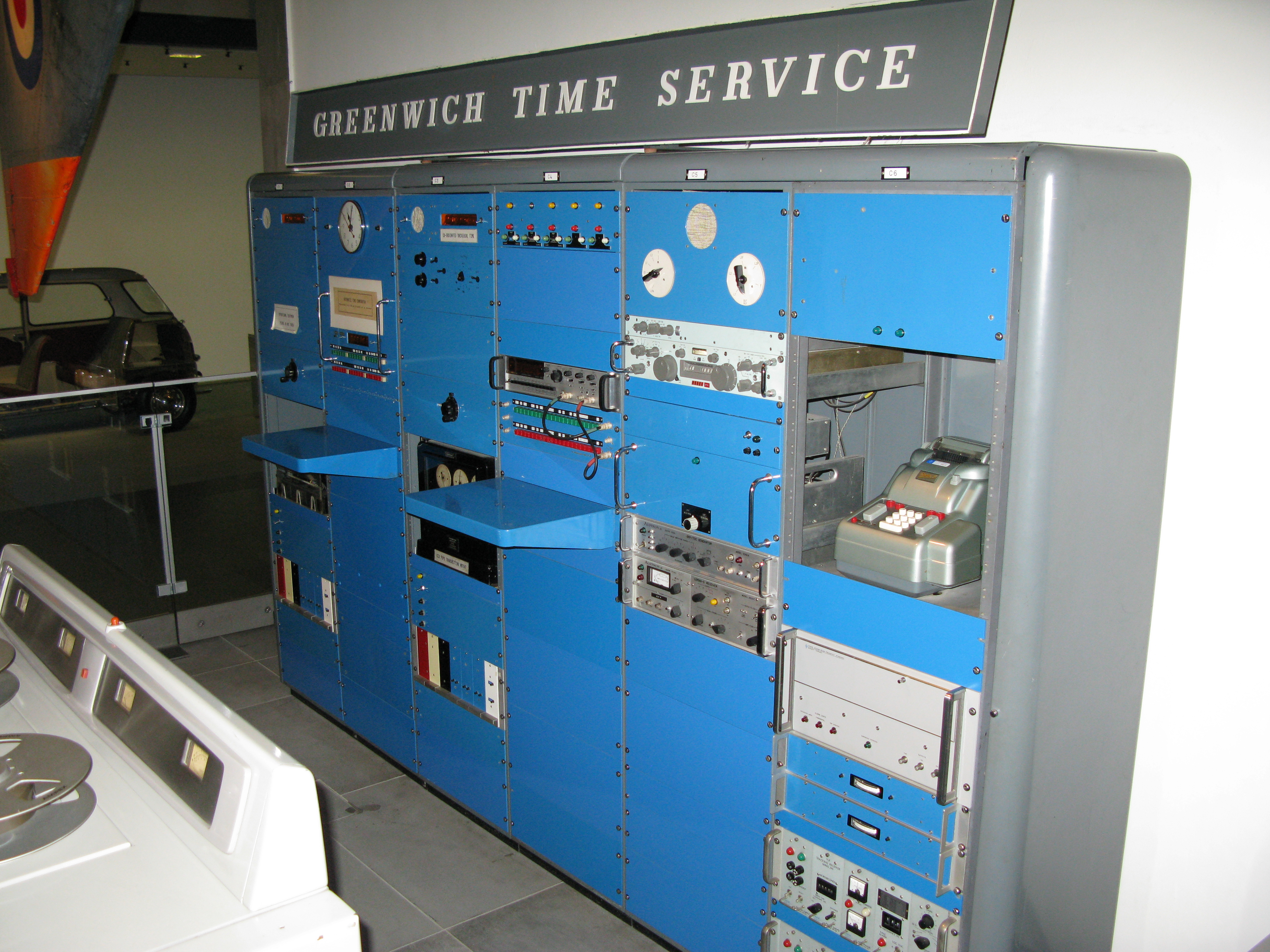
The machine used to generate the pips in 1970

The pips have been broadcast daily since 5 February 1924, and were the idea of the Astronomer Royal, Sir Frank Watson Dyson, and the head of the BBC, John Reith who commissioned Marconi / Siemens in Charlton, close to Greenwich, to create the signal. The company gave the project to an 18-year-old engineer, Harry Lampen Edwards, who was seconded to the Observatory. The pips were originally controlled by two mechanical clocks located in the Royal Greenwich Observatory that had electrical contacts attached to their pendulums. Two clocks were used in case of a breakdown of one. These sent a signal each second to the BBC, which converted them to the audible oscillatory tone broadcast.

The Royal Greenwich Observatory moved to Herstmonceux Castle in 1957 and the GTS equipment followed a few years later in the form of an electronic clock. Reliability was improved by renting two lines for the service between Herstmonceux and the BBC, with a changeover between the two at Broadcasting House if the main line became disconnected.

The tone sent on the lines was inverted: the signal sent to the BBC was a steady 1 kHz tone when no pip was required, and no tone when a pip should be sounded. This let faults on the line be detected immediately by automated monitoring for loss of audio.

The Greenwich Time Signal was the first sound heard in the handover to the London 2012 Olympics during the Beijing 2008 Olympics closing ceremony.

The pips were also broadcast by the BBC Television Service, but this practice was discontinued by the 1960s.

To celebrate the 90th birthday of the pips on 5 February 2014, the Today programme broadcast a sequence that included a re-working of the Happy Birthday melody using the GTS as its base sound.

== Crashing the pips ==
The BBC discourages any other sound being broadcast at the same time as the pips; doing so is commonly known as "crashing the pips". This was most often referred to on Terry Wogan's Radio 2 Breakfast show, although usually only in jest since the actual event happened rarely. Different BBC Radio stations approach this issue differently. Radio 1 and Radio 2 generally take a relaxed approach with the pips, usually playing them over the closing seconds of a song or a jingle "bed" (background music from a jingle), followed by their respective news jingles. Many BBC local radio stations also played the pips over the station's jingle before the 2020 rebrand. BBC Radio 4 is stricter, as it is an almost entirely speech-based station.

In the late 1980s Radio 1 featured the pips played over a station jingle during Jakki Brambles' early show and Simon Mayo's breakfast show. This was not strictly "crashing the pips" as they were not intended to be used as an accurate time signal.

In her final broadcast as presenter on BBC Radio 4's The Today Programme—following 11 years sharing the post—Mishal Husain asked for forgiveness having previously crashed the pips, among "any other dastardly deeds". Husain remarked that "in the tradition of [her] faith, when people used to go on pilgrimage in generations past, they would not only take leave of their associates, but they would ask for their forgiveness because in those days many would not return from the arduous journey."

== Technical problems ==
At 8:00 a.m. on 17 September 2008, to the surprise of John Humphrys, the day's main presenter on the Today programme, and Johnnie Walker, who was standing in for Terry Wogan on Radio 2, the pips went "adrift" by six seconds, and broadcast seven pips rather than six. This was traced to a problem with the pip generator, which was rectified by switching it off and on again. Part of Humphrys' surprise was probably because of his deliberate avoidance of crashing the pips with the help of an accurate clock in the studio.

A sudden total failure in the generation of the audio pulses that constitute the pips was experienced on 31 May 2011 and silence was unexpectedly broadcast in place of the 17:00 signal. The problem was traced to the power supply of the equipment which converts the signal from the atomic clocks into an audible signal. Whilst repairs were underway the BBC elected to broadcast a "dignified silence" in place of the pips at 19:00. By 19:45 the same day the power supply was repaired and the 20:00 pips were broadcast as normal.

== Similar time signals elsewhere ==
IBA Time Signal
The time signal used by the Israel Broadcasting Authority until 2017, which has longer pips in a higher pitch than the Greenwich Time Signal

Many radio broadcasters around the world use the Greenwich Time Signal, or a variant thereof, as a means to mark the start of the hour. The pips are used in both domestic and international commercial and public broadcasting. Many radio stations use six tones similar to those used by the BBC World Service; some shorten it to five, four, or three tones. On some broadcasters the final pip is of a different pitch.

- Australia – Pips are used on ABC Radio National and ABC Local Radio at the top of every hour, as well as on Fairfax Media talkback stations- 2UE, 3AW, 4BC and 6PR. In Australia, the news pips are closer to 735 Hz and each of the six pips lasts for half a second. After each pip, there is half a second of silence. The pips were discontinued on ABC Radio Sydney on 23 November 2023 to coincide with the station's 100th anniversary.
- Brazil – Some news stations, such as the national station Radio Bandeirantes, and the regional stations Radio Guaíba and Radio Gaúcha broadcasts a similar time signal every 15 minutes. In Radio Bandeirantes, there is a 5-pip signal (called "fifth signal"), broadcast every 15 minutes. In Radio Gaúcha, a four-pip signal with three tones in 920 Hz and the last in 1360 Hz is broadcast every 15 minutes. The musical radio network Atlântida FM, which broadcasts to the states of Rio Grande do Sul and Santa Catarina transmits an audible signal every 15 minutes, composed by the first four notes of the song "Here Comes the Sun".
- Bulgaria – On all BNR radio stations, the pips are broadcast on the hour. Five short pips and a long pip is broadcast between :55 and :00. The time signal broadcast at 15:00 EET is from Bulgarian Institute of Metrology.
- Canada – The National Research Council Time Signal was broadcast daily on Ici Radio-Canada Première at 12:00 EST/EDT and on CBC Radio One at 13:00 EST/EDT. It was Canada's longest running radio feature and had been broadcast every day from 5 November 1939 until 10 October 2023.
- Egypt – Nile FM broadcasts pips similar to the BBC on the hour at 07:00hrs daily at the start of the Big Breakfast show with Rob Stevens and Nadine.
- Finland – On Yle's radio services the pips are broadcast on the hour.
- Hong Kong – A six-pip time signal is used on RTHK's radio channels. The signals, which are provided by the Hong Kong Observatory, are broadcast every half-hour during the day and on the hour at night, immediately before the news headline reports.
- Israel – On Israeli Public Broadcasting Corporation hourly radio news, five tones (part of a recording of Kol Israel's original beeps) play counting down to the hour. Right as the hour starts, a jingle starts playing, the end of which includes the IPBC's sonic ident and an a cappella singing the name of the broadcaster "Kan". This jingle replaced the original six tones that played on Kol Israel's hourly newscasts; these pips were 1.05 kHz tones, the first five of which lasted a quarter of a second each, and the final pip lasted 0.85 s. As of 2017 (when public broadcaster IBA was shut down and replaced by the IPBC or "Kan"), the intro was changed and added a jingle. In 2023, this jingle was replaced with a new one. This jingle is played twice, before the headlines, which are now read at 30 seconds to the hour, and then immediately following. The second iteration includes the tones counting down to the hour, which were left as a "memorial to the historical soundtrack".
- Japan – NHK Television formerly used three short pips played at :57 to :59 of the clock ident and a longer three-second pip from :00 to :03 just before the start of news programmes. The longer three-second pip can however be crashed shortly after the :00 mark on certain special events or if there were time constraints.
- Netherlands – In the NPO (Netherlands Public Broadcasting), the signals have been around since 1948, when six pips were used. In 1991 they went down to three. Broadcast of the traditional pips stopped with the last transmission at 7:00 on 2 October 2018, leading way to a new design with three pips that count down to exactly the full hour and make way for a short tune. Other radio stations may still use the traditional beeps at every hour.
- New Zealand – RNZ National plays the six pips at the top of every hour. Additionally, a bird call is played before the 7:00 and 9:00 news on Morning Report.
- Russia – Russia's state radio channels broadcast six tones (five little pips and one short beep). The duration of the sixth pip depends on the current hour: it is 100 ms at midnight Moscow time (UTC+3) and increases by 20 ms every hour, up to 560 ms at 23:00 UTC+3 (the first five pips always are 100 ms long). Russia's state television Channel One broadcasts six tones too (at the end of a short melody) before newscasts and Vremya (the primetime news programme).
- Spain – Cadena SER, the country's largest private radio network, plays a time signal with six pips at the top of every hour.
- United States – NIST operates a speaking clock audio-only station, WWV.
- Vietnam – The Voice of Vietnam broadcasts six tones (five short pips and one long pip) before 6:00am, 12:00pm, 6:00pm and 9:00pm everyday on two flagship channels VOV1 and VOV2.

== See also ==
- Time from NPL
- National Research Council Time Signal – A CBC Radio One indicator for 1300 ET
