= National Research Council Time Signal =

Canadian radio time signal

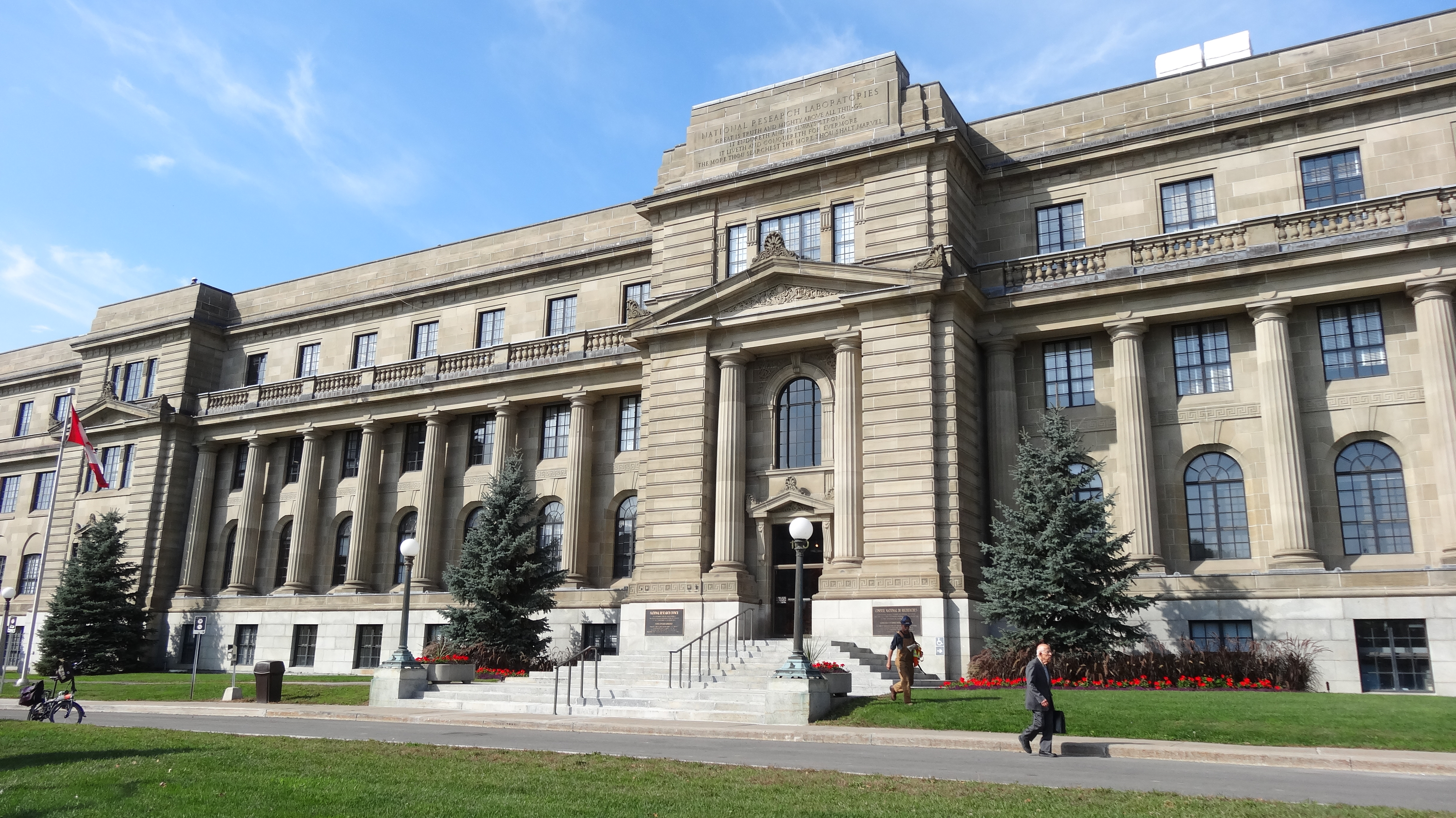
National Research Council laboratories in Ottawa

The National Research Council Time Signal was Canada's longest running radio program, begun 5 November 1939 until its final broadcast on 9 October 2023. Broadcast daily shortly before 13:00 Eastern Time across the CBC Radio One network, it lasted between 15 and 60 seconds, ending exactly at 13:00. During standard time, the signal was at 13:00 Eastern Standard Time and during Daylight Saving Time, the signal was at 13:00 Eastern Daylight Saving Time.

The signal was also heard on some stations of the Ici Radio-Canada Première network at 12:00 ET daily, particularly in Ontario, Quebec and the Maritime provinces.

The signal consisted of a series of 300 ms "pips" of an 800 Hz sine wave tone, each one starting at the top of each UTC second, up to ten seconds before the hour, followed by silence, and then a one-second-long 800 Hz tone to mark the top of the hour. The CBC time signal was typically delayed by about 300 ms with respect to the CHU time signal, because each CBC radio station received the actual time signal from Ottawa by satellite.

One of the first announcers of what was then the Dominion Observatory Time Signal on CBC was Lorne Greene, while he was a staff announcer at CBO.

The most recent spoken header, as announced by one of CBC Radio's promotional voices, was as follows:

The National Research Council official time signal. The beginning of the long dash indicates exactly one o'clock, Eastern (Standard/Daylight Saving) Time.

In different time zones, the local time and time zone was used instead. This header was usually spoken over the initial pips. As of May 2011, the length of the silence had been reduced to six seconds, with a soft click at the beginning of each second during the silence.

At the top of many other hours, and at the discretion of each station, a one-second tone was sounded, but the hour itself was not necessarily announced.

The segment was discontinued in part due to concerns about accuracy as the CBC's feed is distributed over the internet and satellite as well as conventional radio. An NRC spokesperson noted that the CBC's installation of HD Radio transmitters led to a delay of up to 9 seconds in transmission. The CBC itself noted that with different distribution methods for CBC radio, it could no longer ensure the time signal's accuracy.

The NRC's radio clock, broadcast on shortwave radio station CHU was discontinued in June 2026 after more than a century.

== NRC Telephone Talking Clock ==
NRC runs two telephone numbers that announce the time of day. Voice announcements of Eastern Time are made every 10 seconds, followed by a tone indicating the exact time. This service is available to the general public by dialing +1 (613) 745-1576 for English service and +1 (613) 745-9426 for French service. The call is automatically cut off after 30 seconds or three announcements. Long-distance charges may apply for those calling from outside the Ottawa/Gatineau area, depending on provider.

The English message, voiced by late CBC Radio announcer Harry Mannis, is in the following format, repeated every ten seconds:

"NRC, Eastern (Standard/Daylight) Time, h hours, m minutes, and s seconds."

The French service uses the voice of Radio-Canada news anchor Simon Durivage, with the following message format:

"CNRC, Heure (Normale/Avancée) de l'Est, h heures, m minutes, et s secondes."

This is followed by a single 800 Hz beep lasting 0.3 seconds. The word "exactly" (in French, précises) replaces "and s seconds"/"et s seconds" at the top of the minute. Additionally, there is an 800 Hz "tick" every second in the background.

During the late 1980s and early 1990s, a modified version of the NRC Telephone Talking Clock was transmitted over television channel CPAC (and, prior to 1992, its predecessor the CBC Parliamentary Television Network) while the House of Commons was not sitting. The announcements alternated between English and French, and cycled through all six of Canada's time zones, as well as UTC.

== NRC NTP service ==
The NRC offers time synchronization over the Internet using Network Time Protocol. Computers, routers, and other devices with NTP clients (including Windows 2000 and later versions of Windows) can use these servers to ensure that they have the correct time.

The NTP stratum-2 servers are at these addresses:

- time.nrc.ca
- time.chu.nrc.ca

The NRC NTP service was subject to multiple denial-of-service attacks in 2014, which led to minor disruptions.

== See also ==
- Greenwich Time Signal - BBC Radio hourly time indicator
- CHU (radio station)
