= Accurist =

English watch manufacturer

- Type: Privately Held Company
- Industry: Retail Jewellery
- Founded: 1946; in Clerkenwell, London
- Founder: Asher Loftus; Rebecca Loftus and Sophie Loftus
- Headquarters: Leicestershire
- Products: Watches
- Parent: Time Products (UK) LTD
- Website: www.accurist.co.uk

Previous logo

Accurist Watches Ltd is an English watch manufacturer, headquartered in Leicestershire. The brand was established in 1946 in St John Street, Clerkenwell, London, by Asher and Rebecca Loftus.

== Overview ==
Accurist became the first company to sponsor the United Kingdom's speaking clock service between 1986 and 2008, and also sponsored a Millennium Countdown clock at the Royal Observatory, Greenwich, which counted down the last 1,000 days before the year 2000 at the historic observatory.

The Loftus family maintained ownership of the company until 2014 when Time Products Limited, which operate Sekonda and Limit, acquired the brand.
