= The Nudist Story =

1960 British film by Ramsey Harrington

- Directed by: Ramsey Herrington
- Written by: Mark Grantham (as Norman Armstrong)
- Produced by: Edward J. Danziger; Harry Lee Danziger; John P. Wyler
- Starring: Shelley Martin; Brian Cobby; Anthony Oliver
- Cinematography: James Wilson
- Edited by: Spencer Reeve
- Music by: Tony Crombie
- Production companies: Danzinger Productions; The British Sunbathing Association
- Distributed by: Eros (UK)
- Release date: May 1960
- Running time: 69 mins
- Country: United Kingdom
- Language: English

The Nudist Story (U.S. title: Pussycat's Paradise; also known as Five Acres and For Members Only) is a 1960 British second feature ('B') film directed by Ramsey Herrington and starring Shelley Martin and Brian Cobby. It was written by Mark Grantham (as Norman Armstrong) and produced by The Danzigers.

A drama set in a nudist colony, the film includes two song and dance numbers.

== Plot ==
Prudish businesswoman Jane Robinson inherits the Avonmore Sun Camp from her eccentric grandfather and decides to sell it so she can pay taxes on the relative's estate. However, some of the members ask her to take a look at the club first. While touring the grounds, she starts to fall in love with the place and also with one of its handsome patrons. Jane soon finds herself embroiled in a hazardous love triangle.

== Cast ==
- Shelley Martin as Jane Robinson
- Brian Cobby as Bob Sutton
- Natalie Lynn as Aunt Meg
- Anthony Oliver as Stephen Blake
- Joy Hinton as Carol Sutton
- Jacqueline D'Orsay as Gloria Phillips
- Paul Kendrick as Tim Sutton

== Production ==
It was one of only two films directed by Herrington, the other being Compelled (1960), also produced by the Danzigers.

== Critical reception ==
The Monthly Film Bulletin wrote: "Games, bathing, sing-songs and rock'n'roll punctuate this ingenuously written and acted piece of propaganda; but without the slightest stimulus of some kind of showmanship the sight of bare bodies basking in a Technicolor sun begins to pall very early on."

Kine Weekly wrote: "The picture cunningly uses its uninhibited story to mirror the many aspects of nudist camp life, including, games, swimming and sing-songs. Shelley Martin shows plenty of spirit and a well-upholstered chassis as Jane, Brian Cobby is a manly Bob, Jacqueline D'Orsay fills the bill as the unscrupulous Gloria, Anthony Oliver registers as the caddish Steve, and Natalie Lynn gives a homely touch to the proceedings as Aunt Meg. The sensational is avoided by familiarising audiences with sex, Technicolor gives a professional sheen to the 'brochure' and the musical accompaniment is first-class."

Picture Show called the film a "sugary, sweet coy romance set in a nudist colony."

The Manchester Guardian wrote: "It's the Citizen Kane of nudist films."
