= Richard Peach =

Australian journalist

Richard Peach (1949–2008) was an Australian Broadcasting Corporation news anchor, and the voice of the Australian speaking clock.

Peach was ABC Gippsland radio breakfast announcer and station manager during the early 1990s. He was known to Gippsland audiences before that for his role as presenter on the Victorian regional afternoon program.

Peach died on Sunday, 30 November 2008 in Yogyakarta, Indonesia.
