= National Communication Museum =

Australian collection of telecommunication equipment

Coordinates: 37°49′21.21″S 145°2′11.17″E

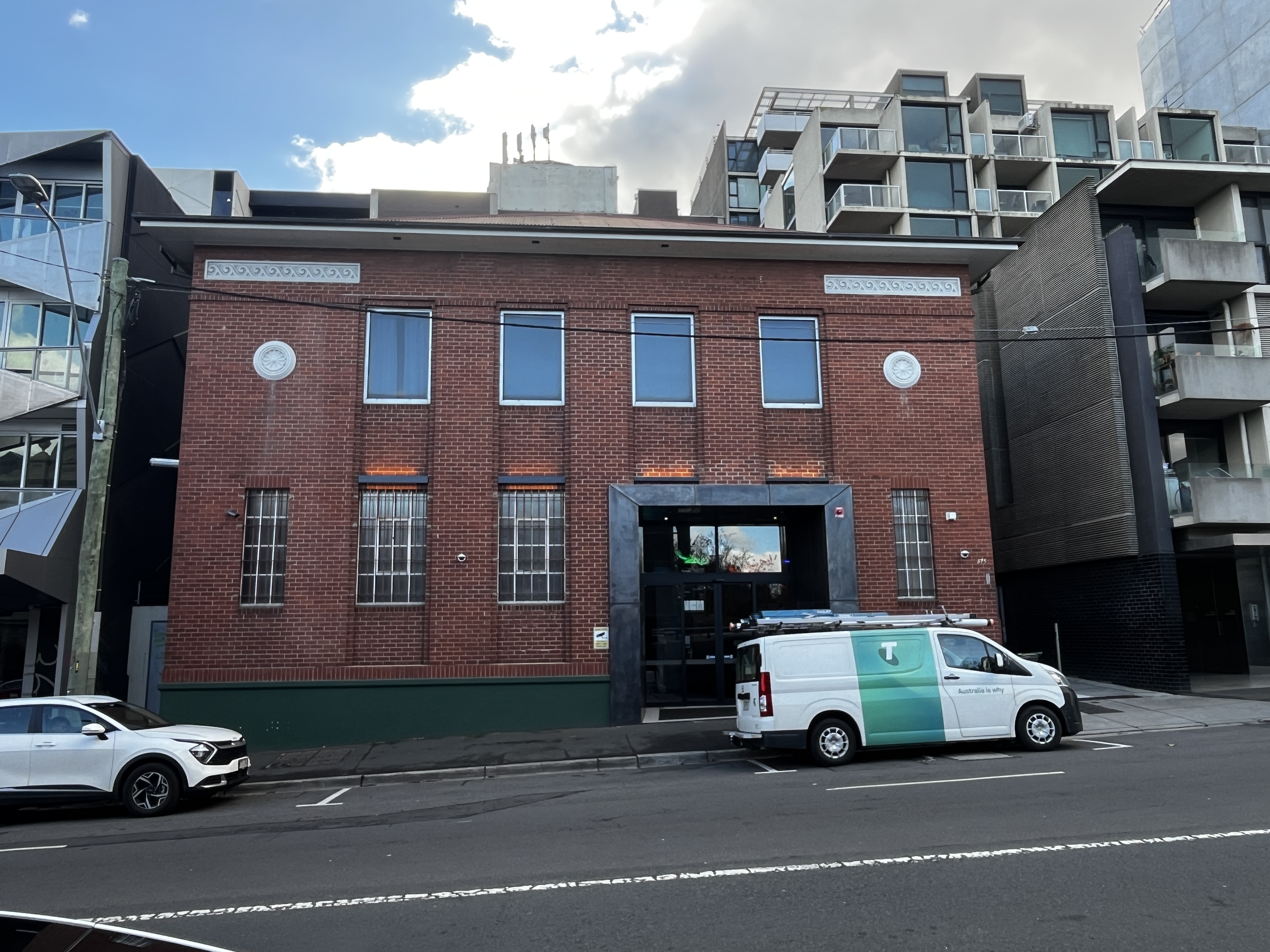
The National Communication Museum in Hawthorn, 2025

National Communication Museum or NCM is Australia's national museum of communication which showcases technologies of the past and present. It is located in the Melbourne suburb of Hawthorn, adjacent to Swinburne University of Technology, and is housed in a historic 1939 telephone exchange building. It opened in September 2024.

It is located on the lands of the Wurundjeri Woi-wurrung people.

== History ==
The museum was given seed funding from Telstra which enabled them, over a number of years, to acquire collections of communications paraphernalia which are deemed to be of cultural significance to Australian audiences. In presenting this collection the museum aims to explore the relationship between humanity and technology and make audiences think about what its future may be.

The exhibitions on display include a fully interactive cyber cafe, reminding users of the 1990s which can be used to 'surf the web', play retro games and chat on MSN Messenger.

It replaced the Victorian Telecommunications Museum.

== Gallery ==
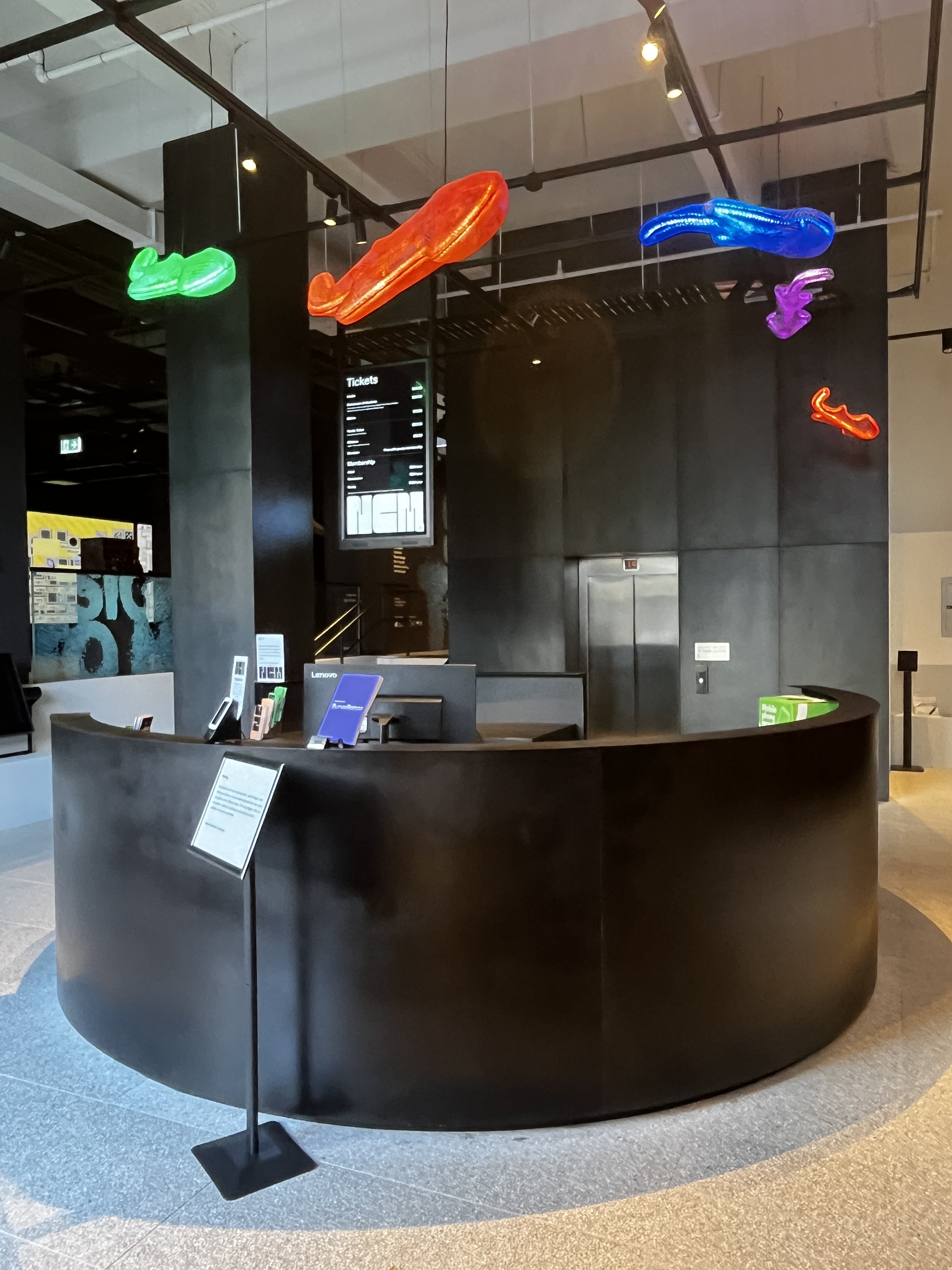
The front reception area at the NCM, 2025

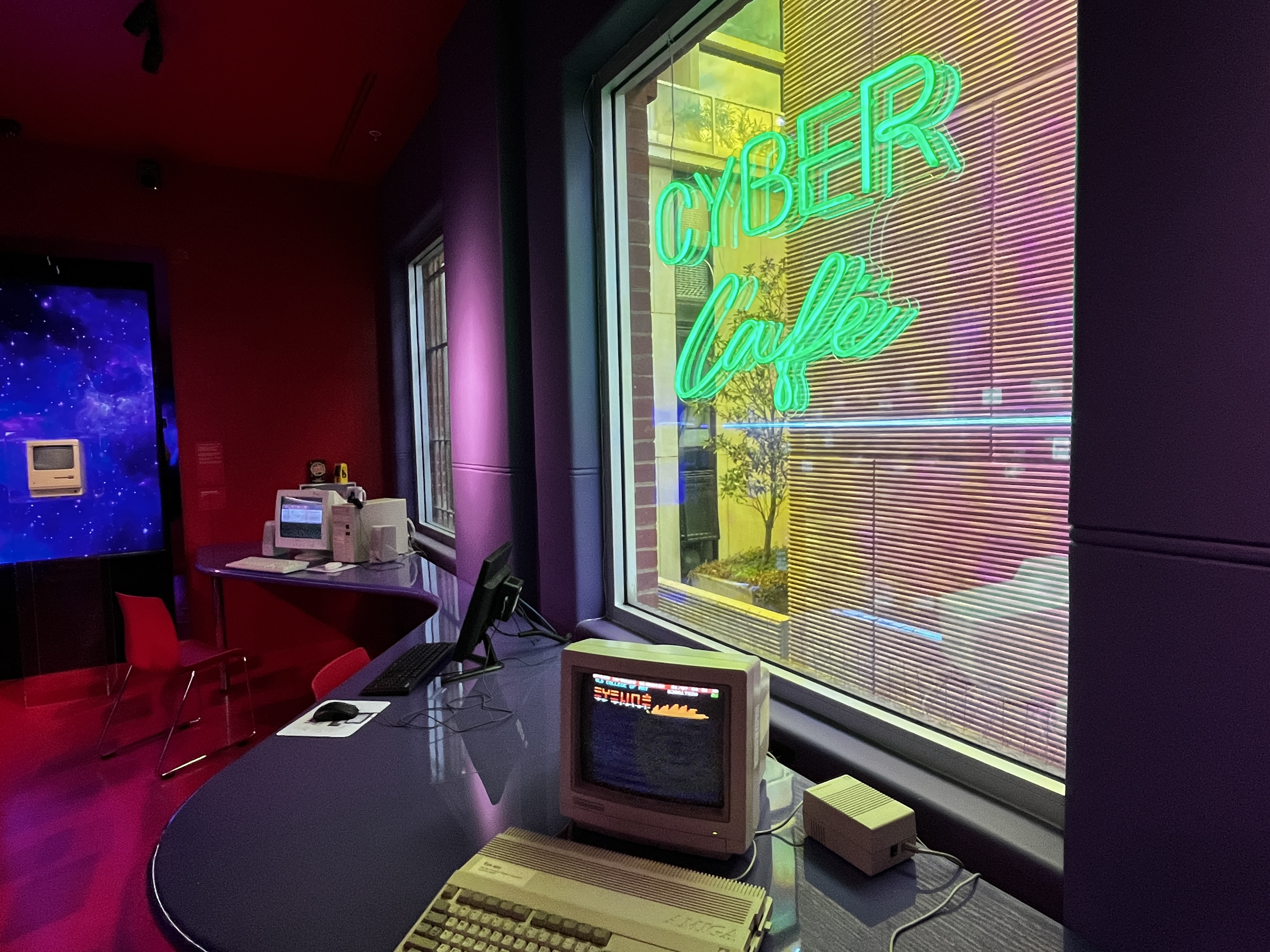
The cyber cafe (internet cafe) at the NCM, 2025

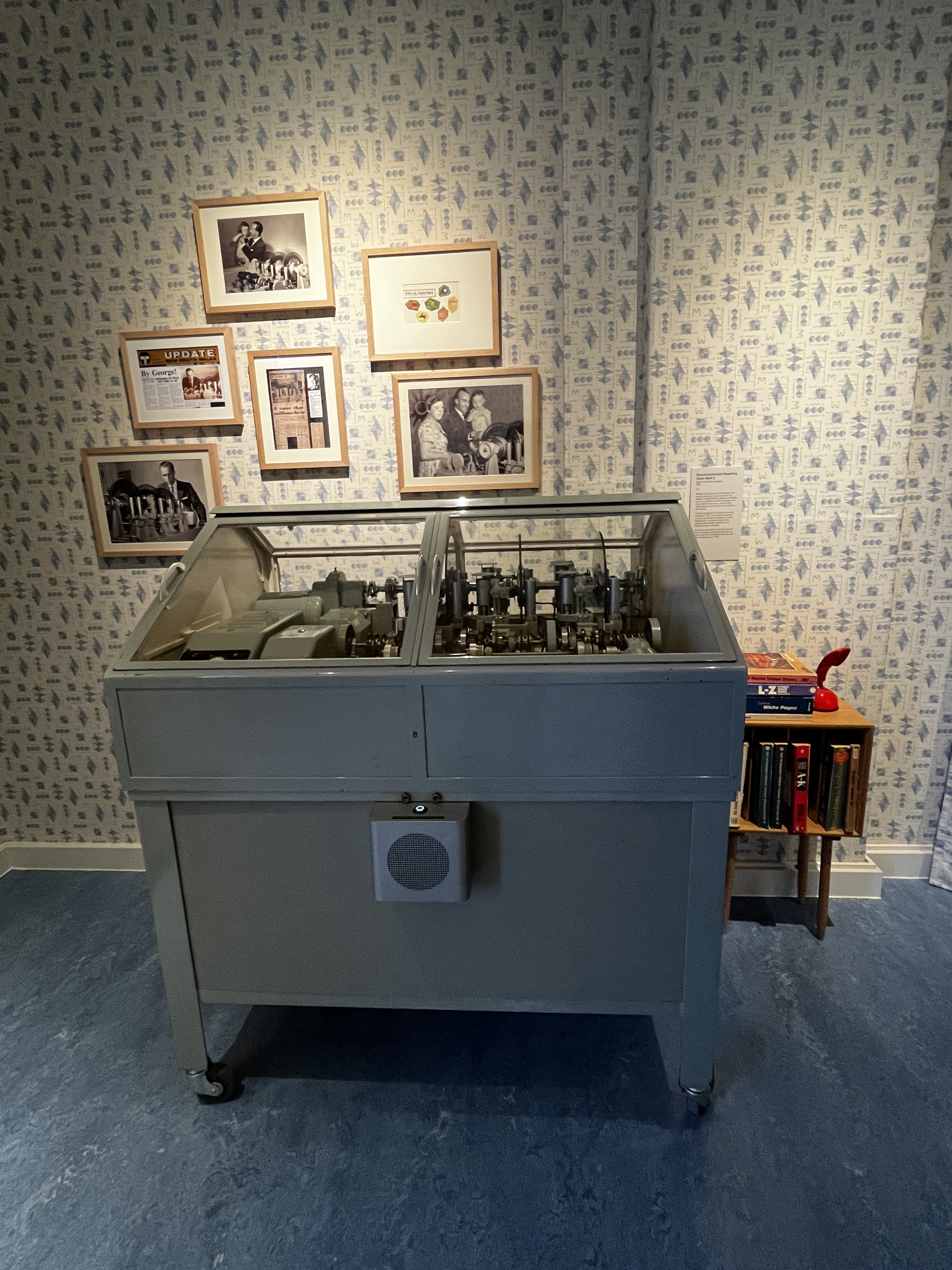
Electromechanical Speaking Clock Mark 2 at the NCM, 2025

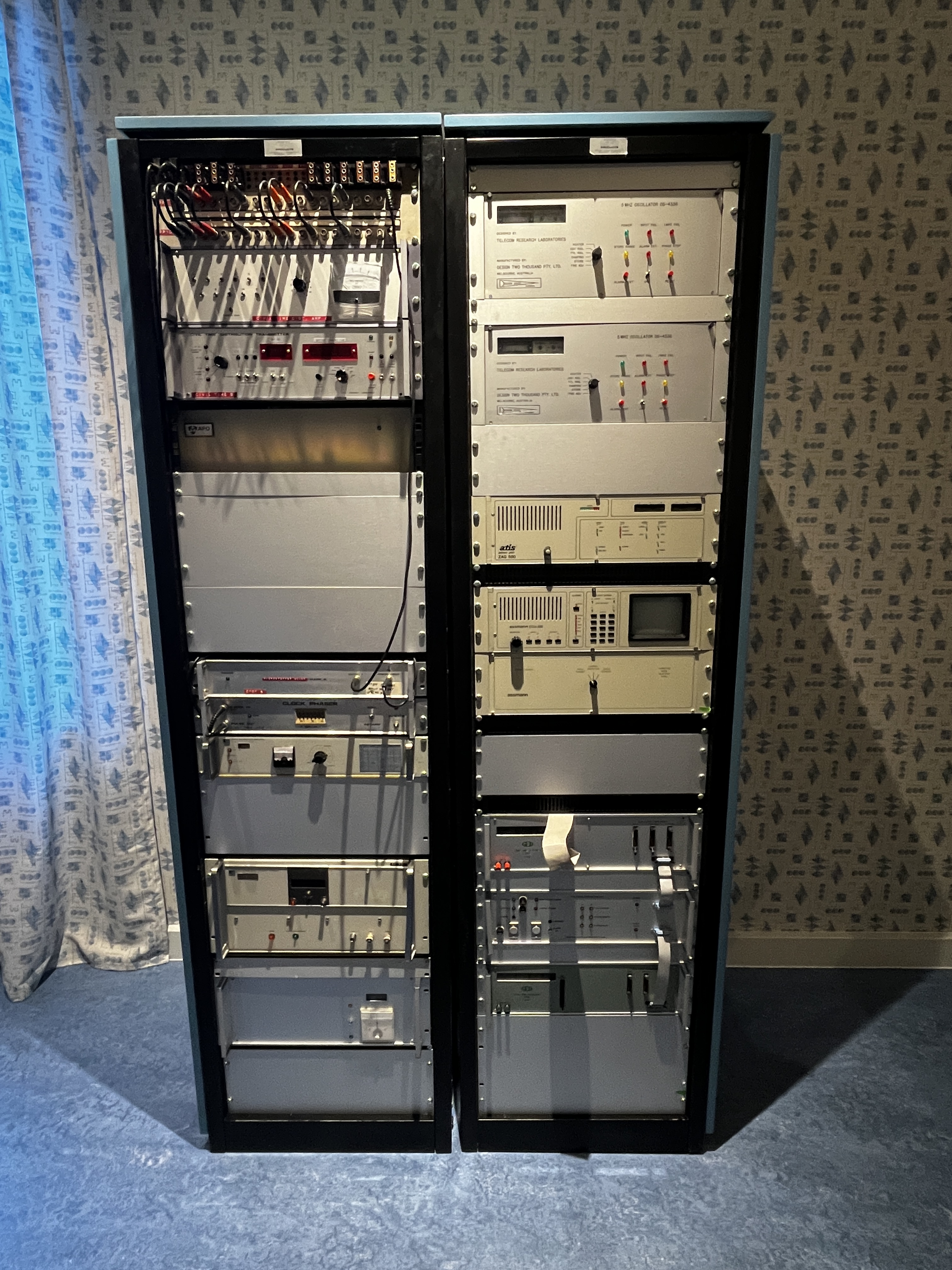
The Assman Speaking Clock at the NCM, 2025

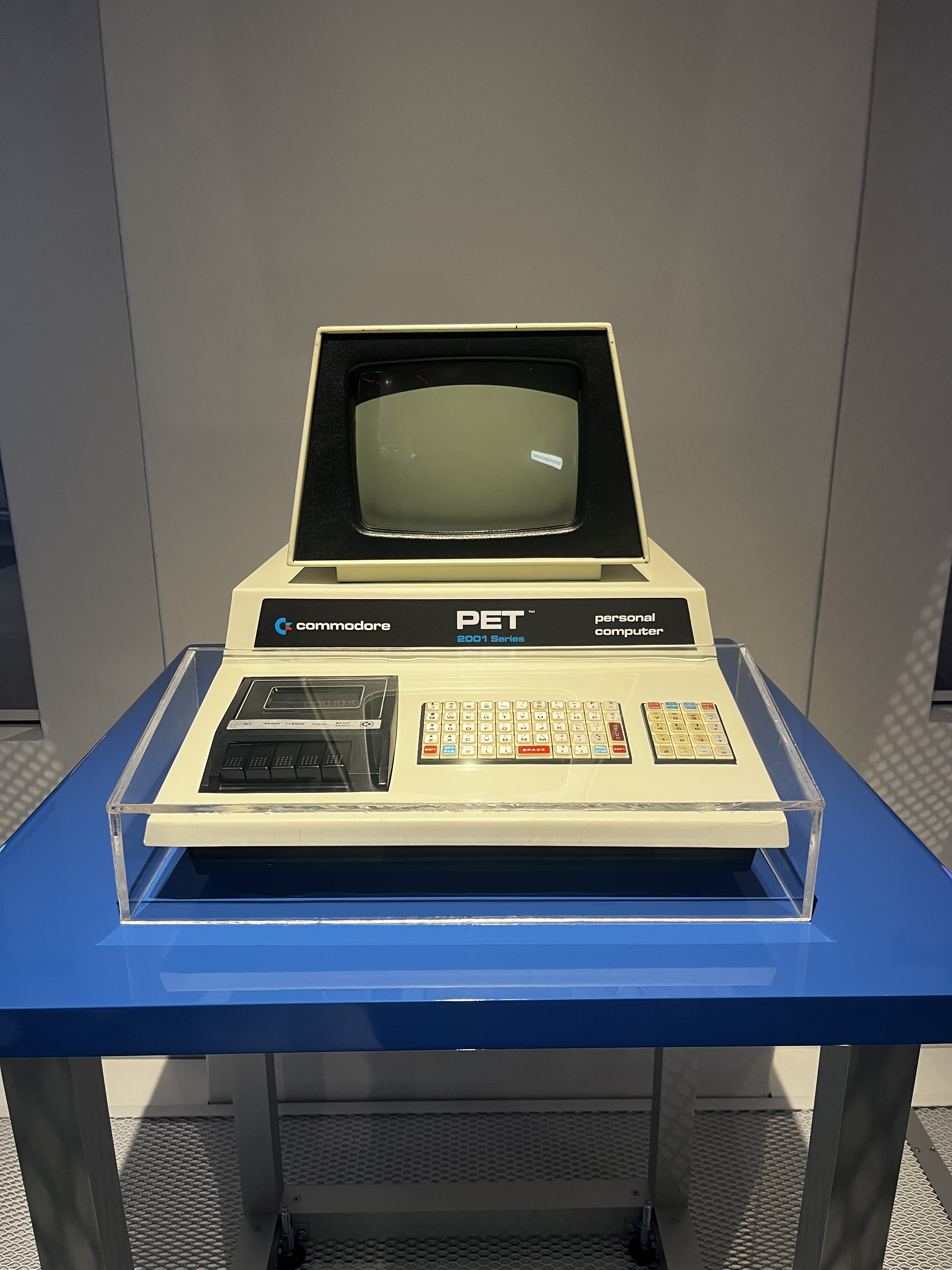
Commodore PET 2001 at the NCM, 2025

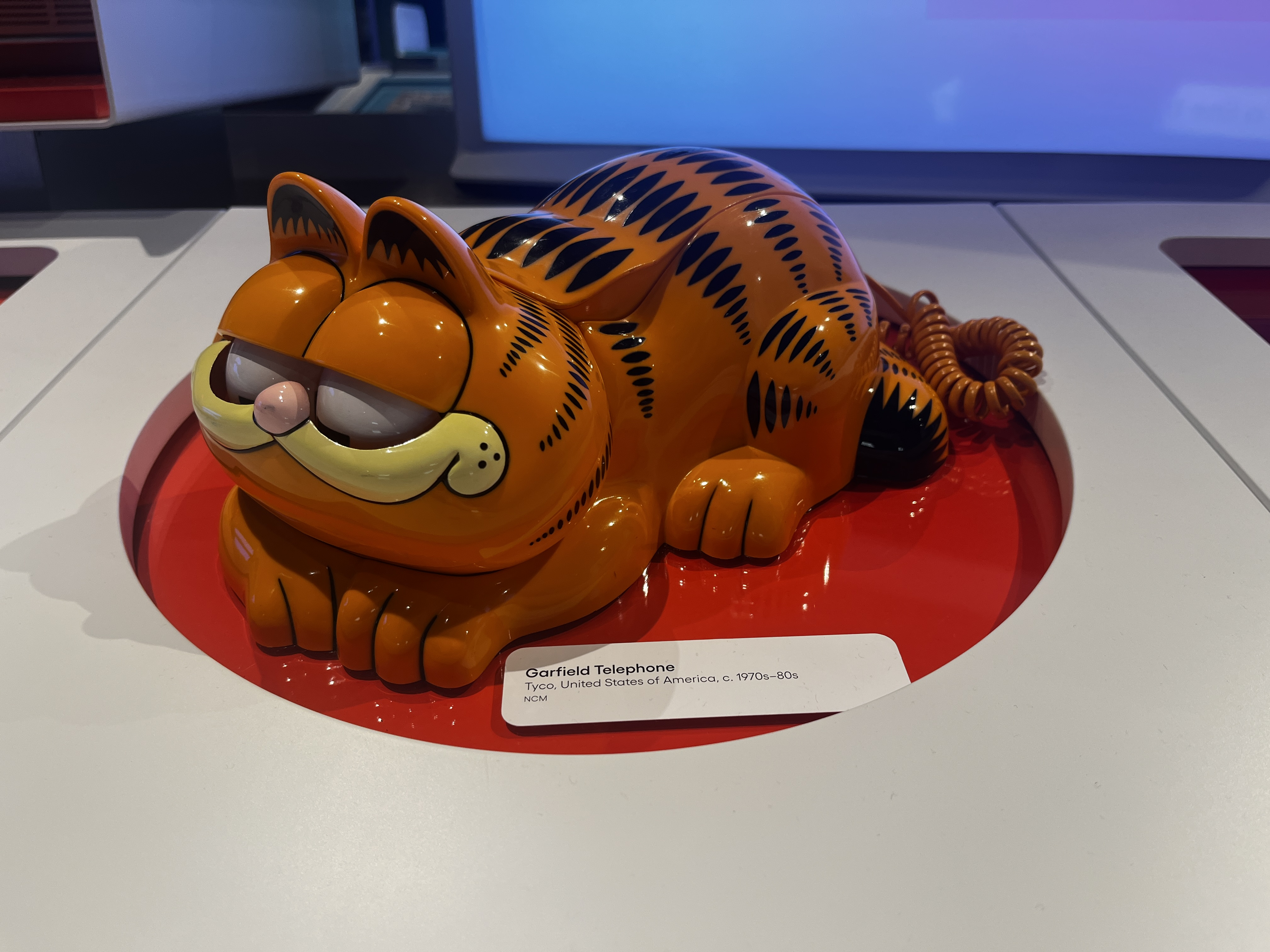
Garfield phone on display at the NCM, 2025
