= CHU (radio station) =

Canadian shortwave time signal radio station

- Ottawa, Ontario; Canada
- Broadcast area: North America; Worldwide
- Frequencies: 3.33 MHz, 7.85 MHz, 14.67 MHz

Programming
- Languages: English, French
- Format: Radio clock

Ownership
- Owner: National Research Council of Canada

History
- First air date: 1923
- Last air date: June 22, 2026
- Former call signs: 9CC (1923–1928), VE9CC (after 1928); VE9OB (until 1938)

Technical information
- Power: 3 kW (3.33, 14.67 MHz), 5 kW (7.85 MHz)
- Transmitter coordinates: 45°17′41.3″N 75°45′28.3″W

Links
- Website: NRC Short Wave Station Broadcasts (CHU)

CHU was the call sign of a Canadian shortwave time signal radio station that was operated by the Institute for National Measurement Standards of the National Research Council. CHU's signal was used for continuous dissemination of official Canadian government time signals, derived from atomic clocks.

The National Research Council announced that the station would close June 22, 2026, after more than a century of operation. NRC continues to provide telephone talking clock, web clock, and Network Time Protocol services. CHU's final time announcement was transmitted at 10:10 a.m. Eastern Daylight Time (14:10 Coordinated Universal Time), on June 22, 2026.

== History ==
Radio time signals allowed accurate and rapid distribution of time signals beyond the range of the telegraph or visual signals. This was of particular value in surveying remote areas, where time signals allowed accurate determination of longitude. In the summer of 1914, a survey party at Quinze Dam in the Ottawa River watershed attempted to receive time signals transmitted from Kingston; however, signals were not resolvable and the time signal from NAA in Arlington, Virginia was used instead.

The station was started in 1923 by the Dominion Observatory in Ottawa, Ontario, Canada, with a call sign of 9CC on an experimental basis until 1928. Regular daytime transmission began under the callsign of VE9OB in January 1929 on a wavelength of about 40.8 metres (7.353 MHz). Continuous transmission at 90 metres began at the end of 1929, with other wavelengths being used experimentally. Time signals were generated from the observatory's own pendulum clocks. The transmitter oscillators were condenser-tuned and so frequency stability was not high until quartz crystal control was implemented in 1933.

In 1938, the call was changed to CHU, operating on frequencies of 3.33, 7.335 and 14.67 MHz, at a transmitter power of only 10 W. The 1,000 Hz tone imposed on the carrier was derived from the quartz oscillator that determined transmit frequency, but the seconds pulses were still derived from the observatory pendulum clocks. The station automatically sent its call sign in Morse code once per hour, and pulses were coded to identify the time of day. Since the CHU power was not high enough to cover much of Canada, including survey parties working in the North, observatory time signals were also transmitted by a Department of Transport station with 2 kW power. In 1947, three new transmitters with 300 W power were installed for the three frequencies, relocated to the station's present rural location. In 1951, a Collins transmitter rated for 3 kW was put in service on 7.335 MHz.

The purpose of the station was to provide accurate time-keeping information, especially to rural and remote areas that didn't have local access to accurate time. The station also pioneered the use of microwave and satellite communication to transmit its signal to remote areas.

Initially, the signal consisted of a constant frequency interrupted by patterns of Morse Code pulses to indicate the time. In the 1930s, station identification via Morse Code was added to the transmission. Since deciphering even a simple time code "by ear" was occasionally difficult under field conditions, voice announcements of time and station identification were added to CHU in 1952, using a speaking clock made by Ateliers Brillié Frères of France. Fredrick Martin Meach of the Canadian embassy in Paris recorded the time announcements in English, which were stored on strips of photographic film and played back under control of the observatory clocks. In 1960, the speaking clock was replaced with one manufactured by Audichron corporation and rented by the Dominion Observatory; this unit had more intelligible voice quality and lower maintenance. New English voice announcements were recorded by Harry Mannis of the Canadian Broadcasting Corporation. Bilingual announcements started in 1964, with French speech provided by Miville Couture of CBC Montreal. The station switched to digital audio in the 1990s.

Until 1959, the carrier frequency, tone frequency and second pulses were derived from independent sources, and the carrier stability was that of any commercial short wave transmitter. A divider chain was put into service so that all of the CHU signals were derived from Western Electric standard crystal oscillators with pulses for seconds monitored by continuous comparison with the observatory clocks. By 1978 all parts of the CHU transmitted signal were derived from an NRC-designed cesium beam frequency standard.

Also in 1959, the 14.67 MHz transmitter was replaced with a new 20 kW unit. All site antennas were replaced with vertical antennas by 1971. The station continued to be operated by the Observatory until 1970, when its operation was transferred to the Institute for National Measurement Standards at the National Research Council.

Effective January 1, 2009, the 7.335 MHz frequency was changed to 7.85 MHz. The change was necessary due to an ITU HF global reallocation at the 2003 World Radio Conference (WRC-03), where the 7.3 MHz range was reallocated to broadcasting. The power output was later reduced from 10 kW to 5 kW due to complaints from New Zealand that the signal was causing interference on its new frequency.

CHU's final seconds of broadcast on 7.85 MHz.

The National Research Council disbanded CHU broadcasts on June 22, 2026. The broadcast of time signals on shortwave radio frequencies ended at 14:10 Coordinated Universal Time.

== Transmission system ==
The station was unmanned and equipped with modified 1960s-era 10 kW transmitters, controlled remotely from the National Research Council's headquarters on Montreal Road.

CHU transmitted 3 kW signals on 3.33 and 14.67 MHz, and a 5 kW signal on 7.85 MHz. These nonstandard time signal frequencies were chosen to avoid interference from WWV and WWVH. The signal was amplitude modulated, with the lower sideband suppressed (emission type H3E). The same information was carried on all three frequencies simultaneously including announcements every minute, alternating between English and French. The CHU transmitter was located near Barrhaven, Ontario, 15 km (10 miles) southwest of Ottawa's central business district.

The systems feeding the transmitters were duplicated for reliability, and have both battery and generator protection. The generator could also supply the transmitters. The announcements were made using digitally recorded voices. Individual vertical dipole antennas were used for each frequency. CHU had long been licensed as a "fixed service" within the band allocations of the International Telecommunication Union.

As of 2020, CHU had three atomic clocks at the station, contained in a special enclosure to eliminate possible electromagnetic interference and compared with the atomic clocks at NRC's headquarters.

CHU mailed QSL cards to acknowledge listeners' reception reports.

== Time signal format ==
Typical broadcast with English voice announcement
A typical minute's broadcast, including the Bell 103 time code and ending with the English-language announcement of 01:26 UTC on 21 November 2010.

French voice announcement
A French-language voice announcement for 01:43 UTC on the same day.

CHU Recording at 7.85MHZ

The primary time signal was a series of 300 ms-long 1,000 Hz tones, transmitted once per second, on the second. The following exceptions to the pattern provided additional information:

- The top of the minute is marked by a half-second-long beep.
- The top of the hour is marked with a one-second-long beep, followed by nine seconds of silence.
- The 29th second of a minute is always omitted (no beep).
- Between one and sixteen seconds past the minute (except at the top of the hour), CHU transmits the difference between UT1 and Coordinated Universal Time (UTC) by using split tones. For positive DUT1 values from +0.1 to +0.8 s, seconds 1 through 8 are split. For negative DUT1 values from −0.1 to −0.8 s, seconds 9 through 16 are split.
- Between 31 and 39 seconds past the minute inclusive, the once-per-second tones are reduced to 10-millisecond "ticks" while a digital time code is transmitted. The digital time code is formatted so that a Bell 103-compatible 300-baud modem can decode it, and CHU is the only time signal station that uses this format for its time code transmissions.
- For the last 9 seconds of each minute (seconds 51 to 59), the once-per-second tones are again cut to 10 milliseconds each, while CHU transmits a brief voice station identification, followed by voice announcements of the next minute in UTC, alternating between French and English. French announcements, using the voice of Radio-Canada news anchor Simon Durivage, are transmitted first on the odd minutes, while English announcements, voiced by CBC Radio announcer Harry Mannis, come first on the even minutes.

The digital time code sent 10 characters at 300 bits per second using 8N2 asynchronous serial communication. This follows the Bell 103 standard, a 2,225 Hz tone to represent a mark (1 bit) and 2,025 Hz tone for a space (0 bit). Immediately after the 10 ms tick, a mark tone is sent until 133.3 ms, then 110 data bits, ending at precisely 500 ms. The final stop bit was extended by 10 ms of mark tone to ensure it was detected reliably, and the final 490 ms of the second are silent. The time of day (day of year through second) was transmitted twice during each second from 32 to 39. During second 31, additional information (year, DUT1, daylight saving time, and leap second warning bits) was transmitted.

A similar National Research Council Time Signal was broadcast by the Canadian Broadcasting Corporation (CBC) radio services daily at noon ET on Radio-Canada's Première Chaîne, and 1 p.m. ET on CBC Radio One. Its last broadcast was on October 9, 2023.

== Western Canada signal coverage ==
CHU often could not be received in Western Canada on any of its broadcast frequencies. Propagation conditions and low transmitter power, coupled with the distance from Ottawa (typically two ionospheric hops), results in relatively weak time signals for Western Canada. In the West's urban areas, electromagnetic interference could further aggravate reception difficulty. CHU could be practically unusable in most of Western Canada, Nunavut, and the Northwest Territories, for significant stretches of time. U.S. stations WWV and WWVH were the fallback in most of Western Canada. In the high Arctic, however, both the U.S. shortwave time stations and CHU were essentially unusable or unreliable. Canada had no longwave time signal transmitters. The American station WWVB is the only option for reliable time signals during geomagnetic storms in the Western Arctic, based on WWVB's published pattern maps. If WWVB is not available, those who need precision time transfer may be able to use GPS time transfer instead.

== See also ==
- National Research Council Time Signal
