= Brian Cobby =

English voice-over artist and actor (1929–2012)

- Cobby in 1984
- Born: 12 October 1929; Gravesend, Kent, UK
- Died: 31 October 2012 (aged 83)
- Education: Webber Douglas Academy of Dramatic Art
- Occupations: Actor; voice artist; telephone exchange worker
- Years active: 1950s–2007
- Known for: Being the voice of the British Speaking Clock (1985–2007)

Brian Cobby (12 October 1929 – 31 October 2012) was an English actor and telephone exchange worker who, in 1985, became the first male voice of the British speaking clock.

== Early life ==
Cobby was born in Gravesend, Kent, the son of Amy and Sydney Cobby, a retail manager. Sydney had hoped to serve in the Royal Navy like his father and grandfather before him, but was unable to join due to a ruptured eardrum. He instead joined Woolworths and moved around the country managing its stores, finally transferring from Gravesend to Oxford, where Brian spent most of his early years.

Cobby started singing while attending Ealing Academy, before becoming a chorister at Worcester College, Oxford and, later, the City of Oxford High School for Boys, where he won a competition to perform at St Paul's Cathedral. It was during this time that Cobby's love for acting grew, and he visited the Oxford Playhouse every week. One day he noticed an advertisement for a job for a young boy or girl at the Playhouse; this turned out to be sweeping the stage, but the manager encouraged him to continue his studies and later return to acting.

After completing his education, Cobby was called up for National Service at the age of 18, during which time he initially served with the Royal Engineers Postal Service before becoming a corporal and running the officer's mess. He also raised money for the Red Cross by performing puppet shows. He was then approached to work for the British Forces Network radio station in Hamburg, Germany, where he became a disc jockey, interviewer and announcer.

== Acting career ==
Upon his return to England, he decided to pursue acting, and attended the Webber Douglas Academy of Dramatic Art. Cobby's first theatrical part was that of God in a newly translated Strindberg play at the Watergate Theatre, London. During the 1950s, he acted in repertory theatre and toured with productions of Ladies for Hire, Intimate Relations, Peter Pan, Henry IV, Parts 1 and 2 and Macbeth.

During the 1960s, Cobby voiced many television advertisements, including ones for Stork margarine, Surf washing powder and Big Fry, for which George Lazenby's voice was dubbed over with Cobby's. He appeared, albeit briefly, in the film version of Evita (1996), standing next to Madonna in the balcony scene. In 2004, he guest-starred in the Doctor Who audio drama The Creed of the Kromon.

== Speaking clock voice ==
When the machinery behind the speaking clock was due to be replaced in the mid-1980s, British Telecom (now BT plc) launched a search for a new voice from among its employees. More than 5,000 staff entered the "Golden Voice" competition, which ended on 5 December 1984 when Cobby, an assistant supervisor at a telephone exchange in Withdean, Brighton, was selected from 12 finalists. The selection was broadcast live on BBC Breakfast Time from the top of BT Tower. The speaking clock had been voiced by female employees since 1936, and the other 11 finalists were female. Interviewed much later for BBC radio, Cobby recalled the selection event and his pessimism in the company of 11 female candidates. Perhaps recalling his leading role in the 1960 film The Nudist Story, he wryly remembered hoping that the selection panel in 1984 would choose "a clock with a pendulum".

Cobby's speaking clock was inaugurated on 2 April 1985 and his voice was used until 2 April 2007, when it was replaced with that of Sara Mendes da Costa.

== Thunderbirds claim ==
Cobby has frequently been cited as the (uncredited) voice of the countdown that plays during the title sequence of the 1960s puppet TV series Thunderbirds, and said so. The year that he cited (1965) post-dates the recording of the series, which started in 1964. Although Cobby was contracted by the BBC for a similar recording, this may only have been for a Tracy Island children's toy.

Thunderbirds producer Gerry Anderson maintained that the countdown was recorded by Peter Dyneley, who provided the voice of Jeff Tracy for both the series' 32 episodes and its two film sequels,

Question: An actor by the name of Brian Cobby has claimed that he was the voice of the famous '5-4-3-2-1 Thunderbirds are go!' countdown, whereas the voice sounds just like Jeff Tracy voice artist Peter Dyneley. Can you please confirm, just for the record, who the actual voice artist was? Ian Fryer, Bradford, W. Yorks

Answer: Sorry, but I haven't got a clue who Brian Cobby is, Ian! Does anyone really believe that we'd hire a different actor to record those eight words in preference to the talented team of artists we'd already assembled to perform in the series? I remember the countdown as being one of the hardest voice recording sessions as it wasn't just a case of someone coming in and reading out the lines. The actor had to really emote, and only an actor who had been involved in the production and understood what it was about could really do it. No, anyone who's heard the Thunderbirds countdown knows that it is Peter Dyneley.

== Death ==
Cobby died on 31 October 2012, aged 83, following a series of health problems.

== Selected filmography ==
Year	Title	Role	Notes
1960	The Tell-Tale Heart		
1960	The Nudist Story	Bob Sutton	Lead Role
1961	The Breaking Point	Peter de Savory	a.k.a. The Great Armored Car Swindle
1961	The Pursuers	Daly	Season 1: Episode 37: "The Contract"
1961	The Cheaters	First Mate	Season 1: Episode 10: "The Schemers"
1961	Another World: Island of the Solan Goose	Narrator	Documentary for Granada Television
1961	Another World: Folk of the Sea	Narrator	Documentary for Granada Television
1962	Richard the Lionheart	Captain	Season 1: Episode 21: "A Marriage of Convenience"
1962	Fate Takes a Hand	Mark	
1963	Calculated Risk	Police Constable	
1964	Sir Basil Spence	Narrator	Associated British Pathé
1964	Men of our Time – Hitler	Narrator	Documentary for Granada Television
1965	The New Men	Narrator	Associated British Pathé
1965	Crane	Lev	Season 3, Episode 12: "The Death of Karloff"
1966	The British Motor car	Narrator	Associated British Pathé
1972	The Man Outside		Season 1, Episode 1: "The Last Target"
1973	The Rivals of Sherlock Holmes	De Beers Director	Season 2, Episode 2: "Five Hundred Carats"
1974	Death or Glory Boy	Rifles Major	Season 1, Episode 3: "Early Breakfast"
1985	The Detective	Newsreader	Season 1, Episodes 1 and 5
1988	Paris By Night	Foreign Secretary	
1996	Evita	Hortensio Quijano	
2011	Danziger Studios: The Untold Elstree Story	Himself	

Preceded by Pat Simmons	Permanent voice of the British Speaking clock 2 April 1985 – 2 April 2007	Succeeded by Sara Mendes da Costa
