= Sara Mendes da Costa =

British actress

Sara Mendes da Costa (born c. 1966) from Brighton became the fourth permanent holder of the role of the voice of the UK Speaking Clock, first established in 1936, at 08:00 BST on 2 April 2007.

== Biography ==
On 23 October 2006, to mark the BT clock reaching its 70th year, a competition was launched to find the new modern voice of the Speaking Clock. Applicants were invited to leave telephone recordings of their voice, with the proceeds of each call going to Children in Need. Sara Mendes da Costa, a telemarketer and part-time voiceover artist, was announced as the winner on BBC One's Children in Need telethon on 17 November 2006.

She was the unanimous choice of a voting panel that included the clock's previous voice, Brian Cobby, the BBC presenters Natasha Kaplinsky and Alan Dedicoat, and Sir Christopher Bland, chairman of BT Group, the clock's providers. As the host of Children in Need, Terry Wogan launched her voice on BBC Radio 2.

She appeared as a "stranger" on the first UK episode of the game show Identity (broadcast on 27 August 2007), with the identity "Speaking Clock", and was successfully identified by that day's contestant.

She was educated at Dollar Academy.

| Preceded by Brian Cobby | Permanent voice of the British Speaking clock 2 April 2007– 9 November 2016 | Succeeded by Alan Steadman |
