= Harry Mannis =

Canadian broadcaster

Harry Mannis (April 11, 1920 - January 2, 2003) was a Canadian broadcaster who worked for the Canadian Broadcasting Corporation. He joined the CBC in 1946 after serving with the Royal Canadian Air Force in the United Kingdom during World War II and retired in the mid-1980s. He recorded time announcements for the shortwave time signal radio station CHU. The audio of Mannis' time announcements was stored optically, on spinning discs at the National Research Council (Canada) in Ottawa. As of January 2022, his voice can still be heard on the English version of that institution's Telephone Talking Clock by calling the Ottawa telephone number +1-613-745-1576.
